= Governance of the University of Bristol =

The governance of the University of Bristol is organised under a number of key positions; including the Chancellor, Vice-Chancellor, Pro Vice-Chancellors and the Registrar.

The Chancellor is the titular head of the University, although in practice it is led by the Vice-Chancellor, currently Professor Evelyn Welch, who is the University's Principal Academic Officer and chief executive officer. The vice chancellor is supported by a team of three Pro Vice-Chancellors, the Registrar and a Deputy Registrar. There are also three Pro Chancellors, but their roles are purely ceremonial, deputising when the Chancellor is unable to attend.

== Council ==
Council comprises 32 members with a lay majority and appoints its own chairman from among the lay members. The members are the Vice-Chancellor, the Pro-Vice-Chancellors, the Treasurer, 15 lay members elected by Court, a member appointed by Bristol City Council, a member appointed by the Society of Merchant Venturers, a member appointed by Convocation, 4 members of the academic staff, 2 members of the support staff and 3 students. Elected and appointed members serve for renewable three-year terms.

The University Council is the supreme governing body of the University. It alone has the power to make changes to the University's Charter, Statutes and Ordinances and make the necessary recommendations to the Privy Council. The only exceptions to this are academic ordinances which Council may only make or amend with the consent of Senate, and changes to the constitutions of Court and Convocation which require approval from Court. If Court withholds consent, then after one year Council may impose the changes without Court's consent.

The ceremonial officers of the University (the Chancellor and Pro-Chancellors) and the Treasurer are nominated by Council for approval by Court. The senior executive team of the University and the Professors are appointed by Council, after consulting Senate. Council may also institute or abolish any academic post, with Senate's consent. Honorary degrees are awarded by Council on nomination by Senate and Council recommends to Court the award of honorary fellowships. In fact, all degrees are awarded by Council, but for the most part this is after the approval of the relevant Board of Examiners and/or Degree Committee.

Council is also ultimately responsible for the legal and financial affairs of the University and is, for example, the formal employer of all staff. The Council also holds Senate to account. It meets usually 6 times per year, and is advised by a large number of Committees, some jointly formed with Senate.

== Court ==
There are approximately 550 members of Court. They include officers of the University, representatives of the non-academic staff, members of Council and Senate, emeritus Professors, benefactors, some members of the Society of Merchant Venturers, representatives of Local Authorities, people appointed by the Privy Council, people appointed by the Chancellor, representatives of other universities and colleges, local Members of Parliament and Members of the European Parliament, representatives of local and professional ('learned') societies, and about 100 members elected by and from Convocation. The students are represented by those they elect to Council and Senate and do not have direct electoral powers to Court. It is chaired by the Chancellor and usually meets once each year in December, although it may meet at other times if sufficiently many of its members so request.

Court was formerly the only body in the University which could approve changes to the Charter and Statutes (before they were petitioned to the Privy Council). Thus, Council would recommend the changes and Court would debate and approve, amend or reject them. After a recent tussle with the Privy Council and the Department for Education and Skills, Court has lost these powers. Council is now the only body which can make such changes. Court's only residual powers in this respect are the ability to delay changes to the constitutions of itself and of Convocation; powers which were only barely retained.

Some 'genuine' power retained is that to appoint the Chancellor, Pro-Chancellors and Treasurer, on the nomination of Council, to appoint the external auditors and to elect 15 of the lay members of Council. Note, however, that it can only select these (mainly ceremonial) posts on recommendation from other bodies and Court does not usually disagree with them. It also retains the power to remove its own members and those of Council, apart from those whose membership results from their office or from being members of the academic staff of the University. Thus most of the members of Court are excluded from this provision, though notably not most of Council, a situation the Privy Council does not seem concerned with.

Court's role now is thus largely advisory. It receives an annual report from Council and the audited accounts. It may comment on the affairs of the University, may advise Council on any matter relating to the University and may invite Council to review a decision.

== Senate ==
There are a little over 100 members of Senate including the Vice-Chancellor and Pro-Vice-Chancellors, Deans of Faculties, Heads of Departments, the Registrar, Librarian, the President and Vice-President of the Student's Union, the President of the Postgraduate Union, representatives of: the Undergraduate Deans, the Graduate Deans, the Professors and the non-professorial academic staff, and one undergraduate and one postgraduate student from each of the Faculties.

Senate is the senior academic body in the University and changes or additions to the academic ordinances may only be made by Council with Senate's approval. It is responsible to Council for overseeing teaching, examinations and research and no new academic award may be created without Senate's approval. Recommendations for honorary degrees and professorships are made to Council by Senate and advice is given regarding the appointment or removal of the Vice-Chancellor, Pro-Vice-Chancellors and academic staff. Note that Senate has no influence over the Charter or Statutes, including the academic elements of them, since that power rests solely with Council.

Being the ultimate academic authority in the University, Senate oversees the Faculties, Schools and Departments and may make recommendations to Council regarding their composition and structure. Similarly, it is the body formally responsible for controlling student admissions and student discipline. Senate has the formal power to declare an opinion on any matter relating to the University and Council is required to take that opinion into account in its discussions.

Senate usually meets four times a year and is chaired by the Vice-Chancellor. After each meeting it reports to Council.

There are a few Committees advising Senate, some construed jointly with Council.

== Convocation ==
Convocation has a large number of members: the Chancellor, Pro-Chancellors, Vice-Chancellor, Pro-Vice-Chancellors, honorary fellows, members of Senate, academic staff, University officers, graduates, honorary graduates and such other former students as Convocation determines, currently those who have received academic awards requiring at least nine months of full-time study or an equivalent period of part-time study. There are also associate members, including all the academic-related staff of the University.

It has little power in its own right, although it elects 100 members of Court and 1 member of Council. Like the other bodies, it may express an opinion on any matter relating to the University and it may communicate directly with Court, Council and Senate. Its principal function is to provide a forum for discussion for all the members of the University who have no other representation, and to organise alumni events and the like to ensure graduates stay in touch with the University.

It meets each July, over a reunion weekend. It is formally chaired by the Chancellor, but the Chair of Convocation usually presides.

== Chancellors and Vice-Chancellors ==
Bristol is headed formally by the Chancellor and led on a day-to-day basis by the Vice-Chancellor, currently Professor Evelyn Welch.

The Chancellor may hold office for up to ten years and the Pro-Chancellors for up to three, unless the University Court determines otherwise, but the Vice-Chancellor and Pro-Vice-Chancellors have no term limits.

As of 2026, the University has had eight Chancellors and thirteen Vice-Chancellors:

Chancellors and Vice-Chancellors of the University of Bristol
| Chancellor | Term | | Vice-Chancellor | Term | |
| Chancellor | From | To | Vice-Chancellor | From | To |
|---|---|---|---|---|---|
| Henry Overton Wills III | 1909 | 1911 | Conwy Lloyd Morgan | 1909 | 1909 |
| Henry Overton Wills III | 1909 | 1911 | Sir Isambard Owen | 1909 | 1921 |
| Richard Haldane, 1st Viscount Haldane | 1912 | 1928 | Sir Isambard Owen | 1909 | 1921 |
| Richard Haldane, 1st Viscount Haldane | 1912 | 1928 | E. F. Francis (Acting) | 1921 | 1922 |
| Richard Haldane, 1st Viscount Haldane | 1912 | 1928 | Thomas Loveday | 1922 | 1945 |
| Sir Winston Churchill | 1929 | 1965 | Thomas Loveday | 1922 | 1945 |
| Sir Winston Churchill | 1929 | 1965 | A. M. Tyndall (Acting) | 1945 | 1946 |
| Sir Winston Churchill | 1929 | 1965 | Sir Philip Morris | 1946 | 1966 |
| Sir Winston Churchill | 1929 | 1965 | J. E. Harris | 1966 | 1968 |
| Henry Somerset, 10th Duke of Beaufort | 1965 | 1970 | J. E. Harris | 1966 | 1968 |
| Henry Somerset, 10th Duke of Beaufort | 1965 | 1970 | Arthur Roderick Collar | 1968 | 1969 |
| Henry Somerset, 10th Duke of Beaufort | 1965 | 1970 | Sir Alec Merrison | 1969 | 1984 |
| Professor Dorothy Hodgkin | 1970 | 1988 | Sir Alec Merrison | 1969 | 1984 |
| Professor Dorothy Hodgkin | 1970 | 1988 | Peter Haggett (Acting) | 1984 | 1985 |
| Professor Dorothy Hodgkin | 1970 | 1988 | Sir John Kingman | 1985 | 2001 |
| Sir Jeremy Morse | 1989 | 2003 | Sir John Kingman | 1985 | 2001 |
| Sir Jeremy Morse | 1989 | 2003 | Sir Eric Thomas | 2001 | 2015 |
| Brenda Hale, Baroness Hale of Richmond | 2004 | 2017 | Sir Eric Thomas | 2001 | 2015 |
| Brenda Hale, Baroness Hale of Richmond | 2004 | 2017 | Hugh Brady | 2015 | 2022 |
| Sir Paul Nurse | 2017 | present | Hugh Brady | 2015 | 2022 |
| Sir Paul Nurse | 2017 | present | Evelyn Welch | 2022 | present |
