= Burke's theorem =

Theorem in queueing theory

In queueing theory, a discipline within the mathematical theory of probability, Burke's theorem (sometimes the Burke's output theorem) is a theorem (stated and demonstrated by Paul J. Burke while working at Bell Telephone Laboratories) asserting that, for the M/M/1 queue, M/M/c queue or M/M/∞ queue in the steady state with arrivals is a Poisson process with rate parameter λ:

1. The departure process is a Poisson process with rate parameter λ.
2. At time t the number of customers in the queue is independent of the departure process prior to time t.

== Proof ==
Burke first published this theorem along with a proof in 1956. The theorem was anticipated but not proved by O'Brien (1954) and Morse (1955). A second proof of the theorem follows from a more general result published by Reich. The proof offered by Burke shows that the time intervals between successive departures are independently and exponentially distributed with parameter equal to the arrival rate parameter, from which the result follows.

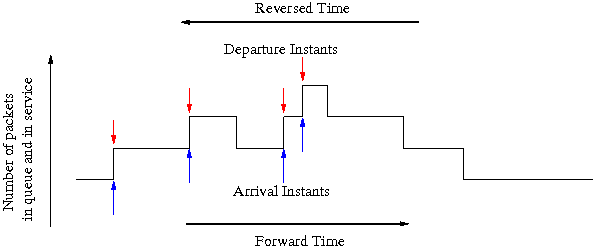
Trace with departure/arrival instants highlighted in the forward/reversed time process.

An alternative proof is possible by considering the reversed process and noting that the M/M/1 queue is a reversible stochastic process. Consider the figure. By Kolmogorov's criterion for reversibility, any birth-death process is a reversible Markov chain. Note that the arrival instants in the forward Markov chain are the departure instants of the reversed Markov chain. Thus the departure process is a Poisson process of rate λ. Moreover, in the forward process the arrival at time t is independent of the number of customers after t. Thus in the reversed process, the number of customers in the queue is independent of the departure process prior to time t.

This proof could be counter-intuitive, in the sense that the departure process of a birth-death process is independent of the service offered.

== Related results and extensions ==
The theorem can be generalised for "only a few cases," but remains valid for M/M/c queues and Geom/Geom/1 queues.

It is thought that Burke's theorem does not extend to queues fed by a Markovian arrival process (MAP) and is conjectured that the output process of an MAP/M/1 queue is an MAP only if the queue is an M/M/1 queue.

An analogous theorem for the Brownian queue was proven by J. Michael Harrison.
