= Skorokhod's theorem =

Skorokhod's theorem may refer to:

- Skorokhod's embedding theorem
- Skorokhod's representation theorem

== See also ==
- List of things named after Anatoliy Skorokhod
