= M/G/k queue =

Queue model

In queueing theory, a discipline within the mathematical theory of probability, an M/G/k queue is a queue model where arrivals are Markovian (modulated by a Poisson process), service times have a general distribution and there are k servers. The model name is written in Kendall's notation, and is an extension of the M/M/c queue, where service times must be exponentially distributed and of the M/G/1 queue with a single server. Most performance metrics for this queueing system are not known and remain an open problem.

== Model definition ==
A queue represented by a M/G/k queue is a stochastic process whose state space is the set {0,1,2,3...}, where the value corresponds to the number of customers in the queue, including any being served. Transitions from state i to i + 1 represent the arrival of a new customer: the times between such arrivals have an exponential distribution with parameter λ. Transitions from state i to i − 1 represent the departure of a customer who has just finished being served: the length of time required for serving an individual customer has a general distribution function. The lengths of times between arrivals and of service periods are random variables which are assumed to be statistically independent.

== Steady state distribution ==
Tijms et al. believe it is "not likely that computationally tractable methods can be developed to compute the exact numerical values of the steady-state probability in the M/G/k queue."

Various approximations for the average queue size, stationary distribution and approximation by a reflected Brownian motion have been offered by different authors. Recently a new approximate approach based on Laplace transform for steady state probabilities has been proposed by Hamzeh Khazaei et al.. This new approach is yet accurate enough in cases of large number of servers and when the distribution of service time has a Coefficient of variation more than one.

== Average delay/waiting time ==
There are numerous approximations for the average delay a job experiences. The first such was given in 1959 using a factor to adjust the mean waiting time in an M/M/c queue This result is sometimes known as Kingman's law of congestion.

$$E[W^{\text{M/G/}k}] = \frac{C^2+1}{2} \mathbb E [ W^{\text{M/M/}k}]$$

where C is the coefficient of variation of the service time distribution. Ward Whitt described this approximation as “usually an excellent approximation, even given extra information about the service-time distribution."

However, it is known that no approximation using only the first two moments can be accurate in all cases.

A Markov–Krein characterization has been shown to produce tight bounds on the mean waiting time.

== Inter-departure times ==
It is conjectured that the times between departures, given a departure leaves n customers in a queue, has a mean which as n tends to infinity is different from the intuitive 1/μ result.

== Two servers ==
For an M/G/2 queue (the model with two servers) the problem of determining marginal probabilities can be reduced to solving a pair of integral equations or the Laplace transform of the distribution when the service time distribution is a mixture of exponential distributions. The Laplace transform of queue length and waiting time distributions can be computed when the waiting time distribution has a rational Laplace transform.
