= Bulk queue =

Mathematical model

In queueing theory, a discipline within the mathematical theory of probability, a bulk queue (sometimes batch queue) is a general queueing model where jobs arrive in and/or are served in groups of random size. Batch arrivals have been used to describe large deliveries and batch services to model a hospital out-patient department holding a clinic once a week, a transport link with fixed capacity and an elevator.

Networks of such queues are known to have a product form stationary distribution under certain conditions. Under heavy traffic conditions a bulk queue is known to behave like a reflected Brownian motion.

== Kendall's notation ==
In Kendall's notation for single queueing nodes, the random variable denoting bulk arrivals or service is denoted with a superscript, for example M^{X}/M^{Y}/1 denotes an M/M/1 queue where the arrivals are in batches determined by the random variable X and the services in bulk determined by the random variable Y. In a similar way, the GI/G/1 queue is extended to GI^{X}/G^{Y}/1.

== Bulk service ==
Customers arrive at random instants according to a Poisson process and form a single queue, from the front of which batches of customers (typically with a fixed maximum size) are served at a rate with independent distribution. The equilibrium distribution, mean and variance of queue length are known for this model.

The optimal maximum size of batch, subject to operating cost constraints, can be modelled as a Markov decision process.

== Bulk arrival ==
Optimal service-provision procedures to minimize long run expected cost have been published.

== Waiting Time Distribution ==
The waiting time distribution of bulk Poisson arrival is presented in.
