= Fork–join =

Fork–join may refer to:

- Fork–join model, a programming style in parallel computing
- Fork–join queue, in probability theory
