= Matrix analytic method =

Computing technique in probability theory

In probability theory, the matrix analytic method is a technique to compute the stationary probability distribution of a Markov chain which has a repeating structure (after some point) and a state space which grows unboundedly in no more than one dimension. Such models are often described as M/G/1 type Markov chains because they can describe transitions in an M/G/1 queue. The method is a more complicated version of the matrix geometric method and is the classical solution method for M/G/1 chains.

== Method description ==
An M/G/1-type stochastic matrix is one of the form

$$P = \begin{pmatrix}
B_0    & B_1    & B_2    & B_3    & \cdots \\
A_0    & A_1    & A_2    & A_3    & \cdots \\
& A_0    & A_1    & A_2    & \cdots \\
&        & A_0    & A_1    & \cdots \\
\vdots & \vdots & \vdots & \vdots & \ddots \end{pmatrix}$$

where B_{i} and A_{i} are k × k matrices. (Note that unmarked matrix entries represent zeroes.) Such a matrix describes the embedded Markov chain in an M/G/1 queue. If P is irreducible and positive recurrent then the stationary distribution is given by the solution to the equations

$$P \pi = \pi \quad \text{ and } \quad \mathbf e^\text{T}\pi = 1$$

where e represents a vector of suitable dimension with all values equal to 1. Matching the structure of P, π is partitioned to π_{1}, π_{2}, π_{3}, …. To compute these probabilities the column stochastic matrix G is computed such that

$$G = \sum_{i=0}^\infty G^i A_i.$$

G is called the auxiliary matrix. Matrices are defined

$$\begin{align}
\overline{A}_{i+1} &= \sum_{j=i+1}^\infty G^{j-i-1}A_j \\
\overline{B}_i &= \sum_{j=i}^\infty G^{j-i}B_j
\end{align}$$

then π_{0} is found by solving

$$\begin{align}
\overline{B}_0 \pi_0 &= \pi_0\\
\quad \left(\mathbf e^{\text{T}} + \mathbf e^{\text{T}}\left(I - \sum_{i=1}^\infty \overline{A}_i\right)^{-1}\sum_{i=1}^\infty \overline{B}_i\right) \pi_0 &= 1
\end{align}$$

and the π_{i} are given by Ramaswami's formula, a numerically stable relationship first published by Vaidyanathan Ramaswami in 1988.

$$\pi_i = (I-\overline{A}_1)^{-1} \left[ \overline{B}_{i+1} \pi_0 + \sum_{j=1}^{i-1} \overline{A}_{i+1-j}\pi_j \right], i \geq 1.$$

== Computation of G ==
There are two popular iterative methods for computing G,

- functional iterations
- cyclic reduction.

== Tools ==
- MAMSolver
