= Rational arrival process =

In queueing theory, a discipline within the mathematical theory of probability, a rational arrival process (RAP) is a mathematical model for the time between job arrivals to a system. It extends the concept of a Markov arrival process, allowing for dependent matrix-exponential distributed inter-arrival times.

The processes were first characterised by Asmussen and Bladt and are referred to as rational arrival processes because the inter-arrival times have a rational Laplace–Stieltjes transform.

== Software ==
- Q-MAM a MATLAB toolbox which can solve queueing systems with RAP arrivals.
