= Alec Merrison =

British nuclear physicist

Vice-Chancellor of the University of Bristol
- In office 1969–1984
- Preceded by: Arthur Roderick Collar
- Succeeded by: Peter Haggett (acting); Sir John Kingman

Personal details
- Born: 20 March 1924 Wood Green, London, England
- Died: 19 February 1989 (aged 64)
- Children: 4
- Education: King's College London
- Profession: Physicist

Sir Alexander Walter Merrison FRS (20 March 1924 – 19 February 1989) was a British physicist. He was a professor in experimental physics at Liverpool University and the first director of the new Daresbury Nuclear Physics Laboratory. He later became vice-chancellor of University of Bristol.

== Education ==
Born in Wood Green, London, Alec Merrison initially attended Tottenham Grammar School and subsequently Enfield Grammar School, before going on to King's College London (which had been evacuated to Bristol during the Second World War) graduating BSc with First Class Honours in 1944.

== Career ==
Merrison was first appointed as an Experimental Officer working on radar at the Signal Research and Development Establishment, Christchurch, Hampshire 1944–1946. In 1946 he joined the Atomic Energy Research Establishment, Harwell, as Senior Scientific Officer commencing research in nuclear physics, developing among the earliest neutron spectrometers. Leaving Harwell in 1951 for the University of Liverpool he was Leverhulme Fellow and Lecturer (PhD 1957), beginning ten years of research on elementary particle physics, using newly developed proton synchrotron machines. Senior physicist at CERN (the European Organization for Nuclear Research) from 1957 to 1960, subsequently Merrison was chair in experimental physics at Liverpool from 1960 until 1969. In 1962 he was also first director of the new Daresbury Nuclear Physics Laboratory (officially opened in 1967), responsible for the construction of the 5 GeV electron synchrotron NINA.

In 1969 Merrison left Liverpool, appointed vice-chancellor of University of Bristol serving until 1984, presiding over many changes in university structure and funding, overseeing considerable expansion in size, toward the end of his tenure making controversial reductions in some departments as government reduced its funding of universities.

== Other activities ==
Merrison combined his vice-chancellorship with numerous other public responsibilities, including service on government committees. In 1970 he was appointed chair of the Committee of Inquiry into the design and creation of steel box girder bridges (reporting in 1973). In 1973 he became chair of the Committee of Inquiry into the Regulation of the Medical Profession (reporting in 1975) whose recommendations were largely incorporated in the 1978 Medical Practitioners Act. In 1978 Merrison was appointed under the chairmanship of H. Bondi to the Severn Barrage Committee established by the Department of Energy to advise government to assess the advantages and disadvantages of a 'scheme for harnessing the tidal energy of the Severn Estuary.' Its 1981 report was favourable. In 1976 Merrison was appointed chair of the Royal Commission on the National Health Service (reporting in 1979) and though initially certain of its key recommendations were resisted, later a number formed the basis of NHS reform.

Other public responsibilities included chair of the Committee of Vice-Chancellors and Principals 1979–1981, and the chair of the advisory board for the Research Councils 1978–1983, succeeding Sir Frederick Stewart. Internationally, his association with CERN (the European Organization for Nuclear Research) resulted in his being made president of the CERN Council in 1982. He served to 1985 and his presidency saw Spain rejoining the project and he campaigned to retain UK membership of CERN. He was active in the general life of Bristol, serving as a governor of the Bristol Old Vic theatre and was involvements including the Bristol Evening Post and Bristol Waterworks Company.

On retirement from Bristol University, Merrison became a director of Lloyds Bank and chairman of its Western Regional Board. He was also chairman of the Western Provident Association.

== Death ==
Merrison died on 19 February 1989. He was survived by his second wife, Maureen, Lady Merrison, with whom he had a son, Ben Merrison, and a daughter, Andria Merrison. He had two sons, Tim and Jonathan Merrison from his first marriage with his first wife, Beryl, who died in 1968.

== Honours ==
Merrison received the Institute of Physics' Charles Vernon Boys Prize for 1961 for his work on the measurement of electron decay. He was elected to the Fellowship of the Royal Society in 1969 and knighted in 1976. He received honorary degrees from a number of universities including Bristol, Bath and Liverpool and was appointed High Sheriff of Avon for 1986–1987.

Preceded by Arthur Roderick Collar	Vice-Chancellor of the University of Bristol; 1969–1984	Succeeded by Peter Haggett (acting); John Kingman
