= Pollaczek–Khinchine formula =

Mathematical identity in queueing theory

In queueing theory, a discipline within the mathematical theory of probability, the Pollaczek–Khinchine formula states a relationship between the queue length and service time distribution Laplace transforms for an M/G/1 queue (where jobs arrive according to a Poisson process and have general service time distribution). The term is also used to refer to the relationships between the mean queue length and mean waiting/service time in such a model.

The formula was first published by Felix Pollaczek in 1930 and recast in probabilistic terms by Aleksandr Khinchin two years later. In ruin theory the formula can be used to compute the probability of ultimate ruin (probability of an insurance company going bankrupt).

== Mean queue length ==
The formula states that the mean number of customers in system L is given by

$$L = \rho + \frac{\rho^2 + \lambda^2 \operatorname{Var}(S)}{2(1-\rho)}$$

where

- $\lambda$ is the arrival rate of the Poisson process
- $1/\mu$ is the mean of the service time distribution S
- $\rho=\lambda/\mu$ is the utilization
- Var(S) is the variance of the service time distribution S.

For the mean queue length to be finite it is necessary that $\rho < 1$ as otherwise jobs arrive faster than they leave the queue. "Traffic intensity," ranges between 0 and 1, and is the mean fraction of time that the server is busy. If the arrival rate $\lambda$ is greater than or equal to the service rate $\mu$, the queuing delay becomes infinite. The variance term enters the expression due to Feller's paradox.

== Mean waiting time ==
If we write W for the mean time a customer spends in the system, then $W=W'+\mu^{-1}$ where $W'$ is the mean waiting time (time spent in the queue waiting for service) and $\mu$ is the service rate. Using Little's law, which states that

$$L=\lambda W$$

where

- L is the mean number of customers in system
- $\lambda$ is the arrival rate of the Poisson process
- W is the mean time spent at the queue both waiting and being serviced,

so

$$W =  \frac{L}{\lambda} = \frac{\rho + \lambda \mu \text{Var}(S)}{2(\mu-\lambda)} + \mu^{-1}.$$

We can write an expression for the mean waiting time as

$$W' = \frac{L}{\lambda} - \mu^{-1} = \frac{\rho + \lambda \mu \text{Var}(S)}{2(\mu-\lambda)}.$$

== Queue length transform ==
Writing π(z) for the probability-generating function of the number of customers in the queue

$$\pi(z) = \frac{(1-z)(1-\rho)g(\lambda(1-z))}{g(\lambda(1-z))-z}$$

where g(s) is the Laplace transform of the service time probability density function.

== Waiting time transform ==
Writing W^{*}(s) for the Laplace–Stieltjes transform of the waiting time distribution,

$$W^\ast(s) = \frac{(1-\rho)s}{s-\lambda(1-g(s))}$$

where again g(s) is the Laplace transform of service time probability density function. Each nth moment can be obtained by differentiating the transform n times, multiplying by (−1)^{n} and evaluating at s = 0. If one multiplies this W^{*}(s) by g(s), then one receives the Laplace–Stieltjes transform for the distribution of the sojourn time (waiting plus service).
