= Art Cosgrove =

Irish academic administrator

Art Cosgrove (born 1 June 1940) in Newry, County Down, Northern Ireland, was president of University College Dublin (UCD) between 1994 and 2003.

== Education ==
He was educated at the Abbey Christian Brothers' Grammar School, Newry. He graduated from Queen's University Belfast in 1961 with a first class honours BA in History, and attended the Institute of Historical Research, in London from 1961 to 1962. He was awarded a PhD by Queen's in 1971 and an LLD honoris causa in 1975 for distinction in historical work. In 2007 Cosgrove obtained the Barrister-at-Law degree qualification from King's Inns but declined to take the statutory Irish exams needed to be called to the Bar by the Chief Justice of Ireland. He took legal action over the issue. Cosgrove was understood to be fluent in Irish but considered that the exam required by legislation passed in 1929 to be inappropriate in 2007. The Legal Practitioners (Irish Language) Act 2008 was enacted following his action, which provided for a system for barristers and solicitors to learn Irish as part of their studies.

Academic offices
Preceded by Patrick Masterson	President of the University College Dublin; 1994–2004	Succeeded by Hugh Brady
