= Markov–Krein theorem =

In probability theory, the Markov–Krein theorem gives the best upper and lower bounds on the expected values of certain functions of a random variable where only the first moments of the random variable are known. The result is named after Andrey Markov and Mark Krein.

The theorem can be used to bound average response times in the M/G/k queueing system.
