= Matrix-exponential distribution =

Absolutely continuous distribution with rational Laplace–Stieltjes transform

Matrix-exponential
- Parameters: α, T, s
- Support: x ∈ [0, ∞)
- PDF: α e^{x T}s
- CDF: 1 + αe^{xT}T^{−1}s

In probability theory, the matrix-exponential distribution is an absolutely continuous distribution with rational Laplace–Stieltjes transform. They were introduced by David Cox in 1955 as distributions with rational Laplace–Stieltjes transforms.

The probability density function is $f(x) = \mathbf{\alpha} e^{x\,T} \mathbf{s} \text{ for }x\ge 0$ (and 0 when x < 0), and the cumulative distribution function is $F(t) = 1 - \alpha e^{\textbf{A}t} \textbf{1}$ where 1 is a vector of 1s and

$$\begin{align}
\alpha & \in \mathbb R^{1\times n}, \\
T & \in \mathbb R^{n\times n}, \\
s & \in \mathbb R^{n\times 1}.
\end{align}$$

There are no restrictions on the parameters α, T, s other than that they correspond to a probability distribution. There is no straightforward way to ascertain if a particular set of parameters form such a distribution. The dimension of the matrix T is the order of the matrix-exponential representation.

The distribution is a generalisation of the phase-type distribution.

== Moments ==
If X has a matrix-exponential distribution then the kth moment is given by

$$\operatorname E(X^k) = (-1)^{k+1}k! \mathbf{\alpha} T^{-(k+1)}\mathbf{s}.$$

== Fitting ==
Matrix exponential distributions can be fitted using maximum likelihood estimation.

== Software ==
- BuTools a MATLAB and Mathematica script for fitting matrix-exponential distributions to three specified moments.

== See also ==
- Rational arrival process
