= Matrix geometric method =

Method of analysis in probability theory

In probability theory, the matrix geometric method is a method for the analysis of quasi-birth–death processes, continuous-time Markov chain whose transition rate matrix has a repetitive block structure. The method was developed "largely by Marcel F. Neuts and his students starting around 1975."

== Method description ==
The method requires a transition rate matrix with tridiagonal block structure as follows

$$Q=\begin{pmatrix}
B_{00} & B_{01} \\
B_{10} & A_1 & A_2 \\
& A_0 & A_1 & A_2 \\
&& A_0 & A_1 & A_2 \\
&&& A_0 & A_1 & A_2 \\
&&&& \ddots & \ddots & \ddots
\end{pmatrix}$$

where each of B_{00}, B_{01}, B_{10}, A_{0}, A_{1} and A_{2} are matrices. To compute the stationary distribution π writing π Q = 0 the balance equations are considered for sub-vectors π_{i}

$$\begin{align}
\pi_0 B_{00} + \pi_1 B_{10} &= 0\\
\pi_0 B_{01} + \pi_1 A_1 + \pi_2 A_0 &= 0\\
\pi_1 A_2 + \pi_2 A_1 + \pi_3 A_0 &= 0 \\
& \vdots  \\
\pi_{i-1} A_2 + \pi_i A_1 + \pi_{i+1} A_0 &= 0\\
& \vdots  \\
\end{align}$$

Observe that the relationship

$$\pi_i = \pi_1 R^{i-1}$$

holds where R is the Neuts' rate matrix, which can be computed numerically. Using this we write

$$\begin{align}
\begin{pmatrix}\pi_0 & \pi_1 \end{pmatrix}
\begin{pmatrix}B_{00} & B_{01} \\ B_{10} & A_1 + RA_0 \end{pmatrix}
= \begin{pmatrix} 0 & 0 \end{pmatrix}
\end{align}$$

which can be solve to find π_{0} and π_{1} and therefore iteratively all the π_{i}.

== Computation of R ==
The matrix R can be computed using cyclic reduction or logarithmic reduction.

== Matrix analytic method ==
The matrix analytic method is a more complicated version of the matrix geometric solution method used to analyse models with block M/G/1 matrices. Such models are harder because no relationship like π_{i} = π_{1} R^{i – 1} used above holds.
