= Skorokhod problem =

In probability theory, the Skorokhod problem is the problem of solving a stochastic differential equation with a reflecting boundary condition.

The problem is named after Anatoliy Skorokhod who first published the solution to a stochastic differential equation for a reflecting Brownian motion.

== Problem statement ==
The classic version of the problem states that given a càdlàg process {X(t), t ≥ 0} and an M-matrix R, then stochastic processes {W(t), t ≥ 0} and {Z(t), t ≥ 0} are said to solve the Skorokhod problem if for all non-negative t values,

1. $W(t)=X(t)+R Z(t)\ge 0$
2. $Z(0)=0$ and $dZ(t) \ge 0$
3. $\int_0^t W_i(s)\text{d}Z_i(s)=0$.

The matrix R is often known as the reflection matrix, W(t) as the reflected process and Z(t) as the regulator process.

== See also ==
- List of things named after Anatoliy Skorokhod
