= Generalized foreground-background =

Generalized Foreground-Background (FB), also known as Least Attained Service (LAS) is a scheduling policy. It consists in scheduling the process that has received the least service so far. Similarly to SRPT, the aim of FB is to improve the performance of a system, specifically mean response time. While SRPT is optimal it is more difficult to apply in practice as it requires accurate estimations of the service time of each request. In contrast, FB does not require estimations of service times, making it more practical but also less performing than SRPT.
