= Method of supplementary variables =

In queueing theory, the method of supplementary variables is a technique to solve for the stationary distribution of an M/G/1 queue. It was introduced by David Cox and David George Kendall.
