= Quasi-birth–death process =

In queueing models, a discipline within the mathematical theory of probability, the quasi-birth–death process describes a generalisation of the birth–death process. As with the birth-death process it moves up and down between levels one at a time, but the time between these transitions can have a more complicated distribution encoded in the blocks.

== Discrete time ==
The stochastic matrix describing the Markov chain has block structure

$$P=\begin{pmatrix}
A_1^\ast & A_2^\ast \\
A_0^\ast & A_1 & A_2 \\
& A_0 & A_1 & A_2 \\
&& A_0 & A_1 & A_2 \\
&&& \ddots & \ddots & \ddots
\end{pmatrix}$$

where each of A_{0}, A_{1} and A_{2} are matrices and A*_{0}, A*_{1} and A*_{2} are irregular matrices for the first and second levels.

== Continuous time ==
The transition rate matrix for a quasi-birth-death process has a tridiagonal block structure

$$Q=\begin{pmatrix}
B_{00} & B_{01} \\
B_{10} & A_1 & A_2 \\
& A_0 & A_1 & A_2 \\
&& A_0 & A_1 & A_2 \\
&&& A_0 & A_1 & A_2 \\
&&&& \ddots & \ddots & \ddots
\end{pmatrix}$$

where each of B_{00}, B_{01}, B_{10}, A_{0}, A_{1} and A_{2} are matrices. The process can be viewed as a two dimensional chain where the block structure are called levels and the intra-block structure phases. When describing the process by both level and phase it is a continuous-time Markov chain, but when considering levels only it is a semi-Markov process (as transition times are then not exponentially distributed).

Usually the blocks have finitely many phases, but models like the Jackson network can be considered as quasi-birth-death processes with infinitely (but countably) many phases.

=== Stationary distribution ===
The stationary distribution of a quasi-birth-death process can be computed using the matrix geometric method.
