= M/M/∞ queue =

Part of mathematical queueing theory

In queueing theory, a discipline within the mathematical theory of probability, the M/M/∞ queue is a multi-server queueing model where every arrival experiences immediate service and does not wait. In Kendall's notation it describes a system where arrivals are governed by a Poisson process, there are infinitely many servers, so jobs do not need to wait for a server. Each job has an exponentially distributed service time. It is a limit of the M/M/c queue model where the number of servers c becomes very large.

The model can be used to model bound lazy deletion performance.

== Model definition ==
An M/M/∞ queue is a stochastic process whose state space is the set {0,1,2,3,...}, where the value corresponds to the number of customers currently being served. Since the number of servers in parallel is infinite, there is no queue and the number of customers in the systems coincides with the number of customers being served at any moment.

- Arrivals occur at rate λ according to a Poisson process and move the process from state i to i + 1.
- Service times have an exponential distribution with parameter μ, and there are always sufficient servers such that every arriving job is served immediately. Transitions from state i to i − 1 are at rate iμ

The model has transition rate matrix

$$Q=\begin{pmatrix}
-\lambda & \lambda \\
\mu & -(\mu+\lambda) & \lambda \\
&2\mu & -(2\mu+\lambda) & \lambda \\
&&3\mu & -(3\mu+\lambda) & \lambda \\
&&&&\ddots
\end{pmatrix}.$$

The state space diagram for this chain is as below.

== Transient solution ==
Assuming the system starts in state 0 at time 0, then the probability the system is in state j at time t can be written as

$$p_{0j}(t) = \exp \left( -\frac{\lambda}{\mu}(1-e^{-\mu t}) \right) \frac{\left(\frac{\lambda}{\mu}(1-e^{-\mu t})\right)^j}{j!} \text{ for } j \geq 0$$

from which the mean queue length at time t can be computed (writing N(t) for the number of customers in the system at time t given the system is empty at time zero)

$$\mathbb E(N(t) | N(0)=0) = \frac{\lambda}{\mu} (1-e^{-\mu t}) \text{ for } t \geq 0.$$

=== Response time ===
The response time for each arriving job is a single exponential distribution with parameter μ. The average response time is therefore 1/μ.

=== Maximum number of customers in the system ===
Given the system is in equilibrium at time 0, we can compute the cumulative distribution function of the process maximum over a finite time horizon T in terms of Charlier polynomials.

=== Congestion period ===
The congestion period is the length of time the process spends above a fixed level c, where timing is started from the instant the process transitions to state c + 1. This period has mean value

$$\frac{1}{\lambda}\sum_{i>c} \frac{c!}{i!}\left( \frac{\lambda}{\mu} \right)^{i-c}$$

and the Laplace transform can be expressed in terms of Kummer's function.

== Stationary analysis ==
The stationary probability mass function is a Poisson distribution

$$\pi_k = \frac{(\lambda/\mu)^k e^{-\lambda/\mu}}{k!} \quad k \geq 0$$

so the mean number of jobs in the system is λ/μ.

The stationary distribution of the M/G/∞ queue is the same as that of the M/M/∞ queue.

== Heavy traffic ==
Writing N_{t} for the number of customers in the system at time t as ρ → ∞ the scaled process

$$X_t = \frac{N_t - \lambda/\mu}{\sqrt{\lambda/\mu}}$$

converges to an Ornstein–Uhlenbeck process with normal distribution and correlation parameter 1, defined by the Itō calculus as

$$dX_t = -Xdt+\sqrt{2}dW_t$$

where W is a standard Brownian motion.
