= Anatoliy Skorokhod =

Ukrainian American mathematician

Anatoliy Volodymyrovych Skorokhod
- Born: September 10, 1930; Nikopol, USSR (now Dnipropetrovsk Oblast, Ukraine)
- Died: January 3, 2011 (aged 80); Lansing, Michigan, US
- Education: Kyiv University, Moscow State University
- Known for: Skorokhod integral, Skorokhod's embedding theorem, Skorokhod's representation theorem, Skorokhod space, Skorokhod problem
- Scientific career
- Fields: Mathematics, Stochastic differential equations, Markovian processes
- Workplaces: Michigan State University
- Academic advisors: Eugene Dynkin

Anatoliy Volodymyrovych Skorokhod (Ukrainian: Анато́лій Володи́мирович Скорохо́д; September 10, 1930 – January 3, 2011) was a Soviet and Ukrainian mathematician.

Skorokhod is well-known for his comprehensive treatise on the theory of stochastic processes which he co-authored with Iosif Gikhman.

== Career ==
Skorokhod worked at Kyiv University from 1956 to 1964. He was subsequently at the Institute of Mathematics of the National Academy of Sciences of Ukraine from 1964 until 2002. Since 1993, he had been a professor at Michigan State University in the US, and a member of the American Academy of Arts and Sciences.

He was an academician of the National Academy of Sciences of Ukraine from 1985 up to his death in 2011.

His scientific works are on the theory of:

- stochastic differential equations,
- limit theorems of random processes,
- distributions in infinite-dimensional spaces,
- statistics of random processes and Markov processes.

Skorokhod authored over 450 scientific works, including more than 40 monographs and books.

Many terms and concepts have his name, specifically:

- Skorokhod space
- Skorokhod integral
- Skorokhod problem
- Skorokhod's embedding theorem
- Skorokhod's representation theorem

== Selected works ==
- with I. I. Gikhman: Introduction to the theory of random processes, W. B. Saunders 1969, Dover 1996
- with I. I. Gikhman: Stochastic Differential Equations, Springer Verlag 1972
- with I. I. Gikhman: Controlled stochastic processes, Springer Verlag 1979
- with I. I. Gikhman: The Theory of Stochastic Processes, Springer Verlag, 3 vols., 2004–2007
- Random processes with independent increments, Kluwer 1991
- Asymptotic methods in the theory of stochastic differential equations , American Mathematical Society 1989
- Random linear operators, Reidel 1984
- Studies in the theory of random processes, Dover 1982
- Stochastic equations for complex systems, Reidel/Kluwer 1988 ISBN 90-277-2408-3
- Stochastische Differentialgleichungen, Berlin, Akademie Verlag 1971
- Integration in Hilbert Space, Springer Verlag 1974
- with Yu. V. Prokhorov: Basic principles and applications of probability theory, Springer Verlag 2005
- with Frank C. Hoppensteadt, Habib Salehi: Random perturbation methods with applications in science and engineering, Springer Verlag 2002

== See also ==
- List of Ukrainian mathematicians
