= Eric Thomas (gynaecologist) =

English academic (1953–2023)

Sir Eric Thomas
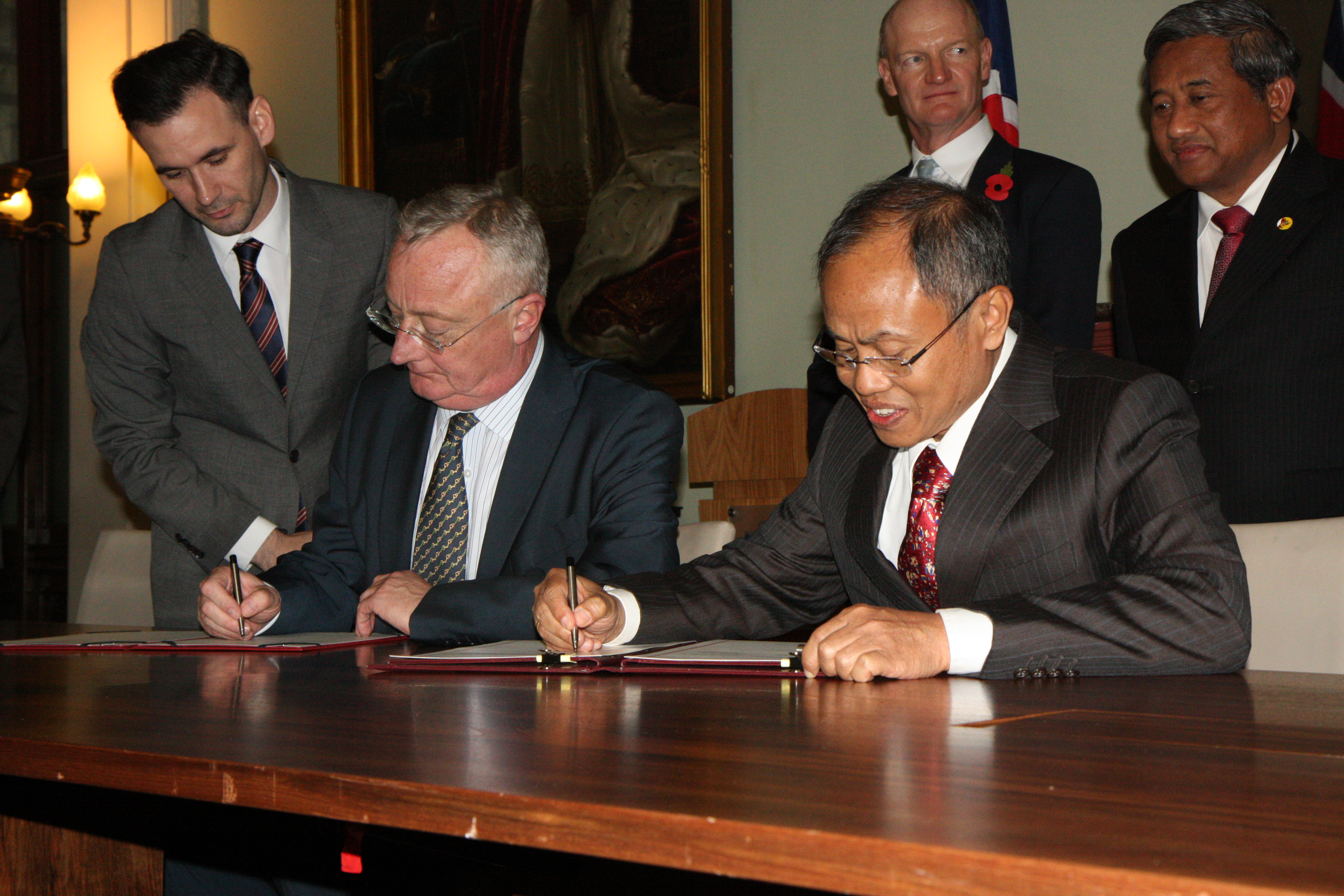

Vice-Chancellor of the University of Bristol
- In office 2001–2015
- Preceded by: Sir John Kingman
- Succeeded by: Hugh Brady

Personal details
- Born: 24 March 1953 Hartlepool, England
- Died: 10 November 2023 (aged 70)
- Website: The Vice Chancellor's page on the website for Bristol University

Sir Eric Jackson Thomas FMedSci (24 March 1953 – 10 November 2023) was an English academic who was vice-chancellor of the University of Bristol from 2001 to 2015. From 2003 to 2007, he was chair of the Worldwide Universities Network and was the president of Universities UK from 2011 to 2013.

== Education and career ==
Thomas graduated in medicine from the Newcastle in 1976. He trained as an obstetrician and gynaecologist and worked at both the universities of Sheffield and Newcastle. He obtained an MD-by-thesis in 1987 via his research into endometriosis.

In 1991, he was appointed professor of obstetrics and gynaecology at the University of Southampton, becoming head of the School of Medicine in 1995 and dean of the Faculty of Medicine, Health and Biological Sciences in 1998. He was a consultant gynaecologist from 1987 to 2001.

In August 2011, Thomas became president of Universities UK, having previously been its vice-president, chair of its England and Northern Ireland Council and chair of its Research Policy Committee. He was chair of the board of CASE Europe, a member of the board of CASE and was a commissioner of the Marshall Aid Commemoration Commission. He chaired the government Taskforce into Increasing Voluntary Giving in Higher Education, which reported in 2004. He was chair of the Worldwide Universities Network from 2003 – 2007. He was a member of the board of the South-West Regional Development Agency from 2002–8.

== Personal life ==
Thomas was married and had two children. His interests included golf and Newcastle United Football Club. He was a Deputy Lieutenant of the City and County of Bristol, and was knighted in the 2013 Birthday Honours for services to higher education.

Thomas died of cancer on 10 November 2023, at the age of 70.

Academic offices
| Preceded by Sir John Kingman | Vice-Chancellor of the University of Bristol; 2001–2015 | Succeeded by Hugh Brady |
