= Skorokhod's embedding theorem =

In mathematics and probability theory, Skorokhod's embedding theorem is either or both of two theorems that allow one to regard any suitable collection of random variables as a Wiener process (Brownian motion) evaluated at a collection of stopping times. Both results are named for the Ukrainian mathematician A. V. Skorokhod.

== Skorokhod's first embedding theorem ==
Let X be a real-valued random variable with expected value 0 and finite variance; let W denote a canonical real-valued Wiener process. Then there is a stopping time (with respect to the natural filtration of W), τ, such that W_{τ} has the same distribution as X,

$$\operatorname{E}[\tau] = \operatorname{E}[X^2]$$

and

$$\operatorname{E}[\tau^2] \leq 4 \operatorname{E}[X^4].$$

== Skorokhod's second embedding theorem ==
Let X_{1}, X_{2}, ... be a sequence of independent and identically distributed random variables, each with expected value 0 and finite variance, and let

$$S_n = X_1 + \cdots + X_n.$$

Then there is a sequence of stopping times τ_{1} ≤ τ_{2} ≤ ... such that the $W_{\tau_{n}}$ have the same joint distributions as the partial sums S_{n} and τ_{1}, τ_{2} − τ_{1}, τ_{3} − τ_{2}, ... are independent and identically distributed random variables satisfying

$$\operatorname{E}[\tau_n - \tau_{n - 1}] = \operatorname{E}[X_1^2]$$

and

$$\operatorname{E}[(\tau_{n} - \tau_{n - 1})^2] \le 4 \operatorname{E}[X_1^4].$$
