= Hugh Brady (academic) =

Irish medic and university administrator

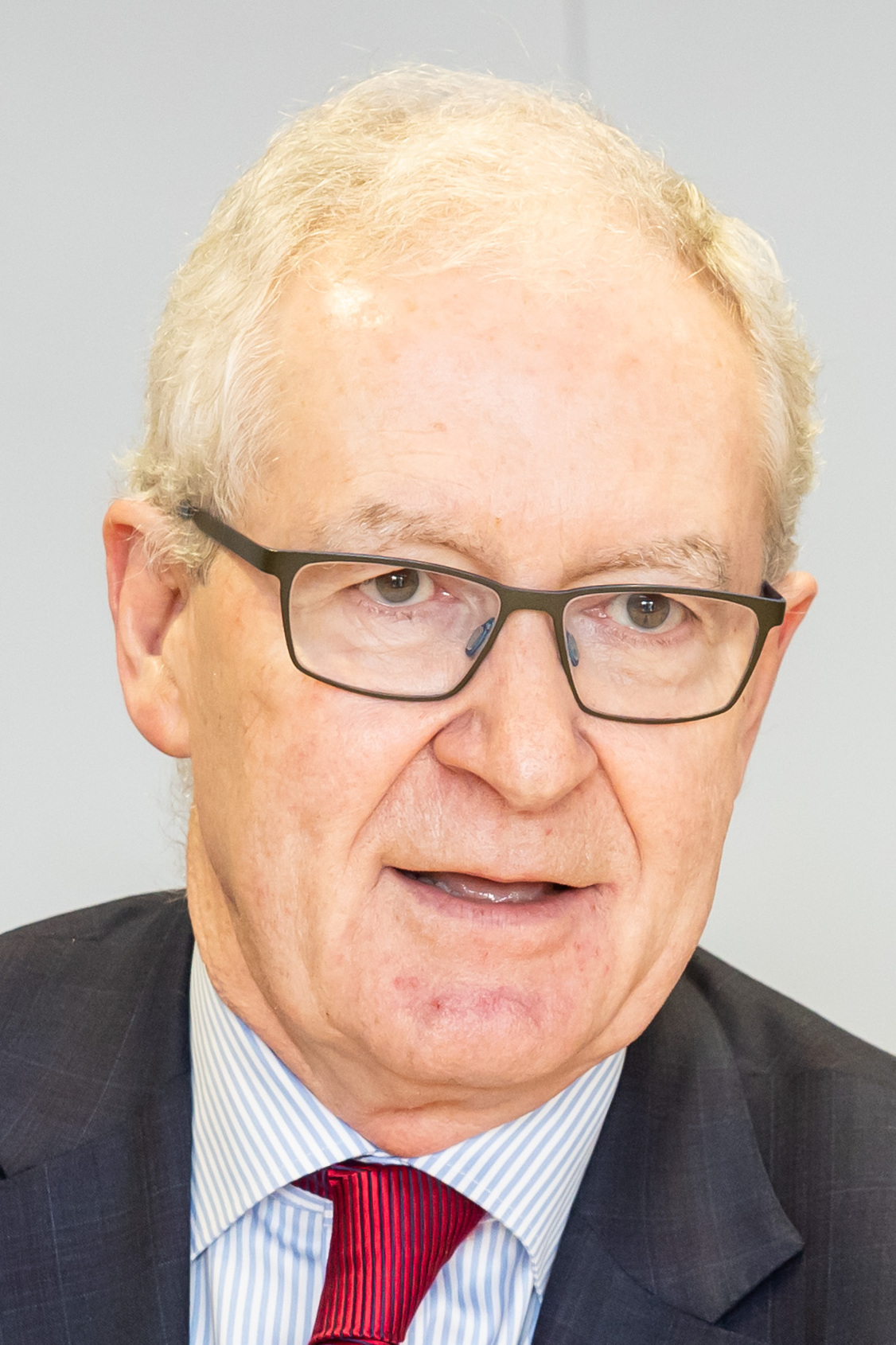

17th President of Imperial College London
- Incumbent
- Assumed office 2022
- Preceded by: Alice Gast

13th President and Vice Chancellor of the University of Bristol
- In office 2015–2022
- Chancellor: The Baroness Hale of Richmond; Paul Nurse
- Preceded by: Eric Thomas
- Succeeded by: Evelyn Welch

8th President of University College, Dublin
- In office 2004–2013
- Preceded by: Art Cosgrove
- Succeeded by: Andrew Deeks

Personal details
- Born: 9 August 1959 (age 66); Dublin, Ireland
- Education: University College, Dublin (BM, BCh, BAO, BSc, PhD, MD)
- Scientific career
- Fields: Medical research; Nephrology
- Institutions: Harvard Medical School; Mater Misericordiae University Hospital; University College, Dublin; University of Bristol

Hugh Redmond Brady (born 9 August 1959) is an Irish academic, the 17th President of Imperial College London, and a professor of medicine. He was the 13th President and Vice-Chancellor of the University of Bristol. He is also President Emeritus of University College, Dublin (UCD), having served as UCD's eighth President from 2004 to 2013.

== Early life and education ==
Brady was born on 9 August 1959 in Dublin. Brady attended Presentation College, Bray, Moville National School and Newbridge College. He studied medicine at University College, Dublin (UCD), part of the National University of Ireland (NUI), and graduated with a M.B., B.Ch., B.A.O. (Hons) in 1982. He was subsequently awarded a B.Sc. (Hons) in pharmacology (1984), a Ph.D. for his research in renal physiology (1993) and an M.D. for research in molecular medicine.

In 1985, Brady became a member of the Royal College of Physicians of Ireland (RCPI) and a Diplomate of the American Boards of Internal Medicine (1992) and Nephrology (1993). He trained in St. Vincent's University Hospital and St. Laurence's (Richmond) Hospital, Dublin, before undertaking Fellowships in Nephrology in the Toronto Western Hospital, University of Toronto, in 1986 and the Brigham and Women's Hospital, Harvard Medical School, Boston, in 1987.

== Medical career ==
From 1987 to 1996, Brady served sequentially as Fellow, instructor in medicine, assistant professor of medicine and associate professor of medicine at Harvard University, where he led his own research group and taught at Harvard Medical School. He was also Attending (consultant) Physician at the Brigham and Women's Hospital and director of nephrology at the Harvard-affiliated Brockton-West Roxbury VA Medical Centre. He was awarded research grants from the William H. Milton Fund, National Institutes of Health (NIDDK), National Kidney Foundation, USA and American Heart Association. In 1996, Brady was appointed professor of medicine and therapeutics at UCD and consultant physician the Mater Misericordiae University Hospital in Dublin in 1996. From 2000 to 2003, he served as UCD's head of the department of medicine. He established new outpatient hemodialysis and peritoneal dialysis units in the Mater Misericordiae University Hospital. He was awarded research grants from the Wellcome Trust, Irish Health Research Board, EU, and industry to build a research group of 40 researchers and support staff. He also led the development of the new UCD McAuley Education and Research Centre on the site of the Mater Misericordiae University Hospital.

=== Research ===
Brady's research interests include the molecular pathogenesis of diabetic kidney disease and pro-resolution pathways in inflammatory disease. He has published over 160 research articles, reviews and book chapters, including invited contributions to major international textbooks in nephrology and general medicine such as Brenner and Rector's The Kidney and Harrison's Principles of Internal Medicine. He has co-edited two textbooks: Therapy in Nephrology and Hypertension (with C. Wilcox) and Intensive Care Nephrology (with P. Murray and J.B. Hall).

== Non-medical career ==
=== President of University College, Dublin (2004–2013) ===
In January 2004, at the age of 44, Brady was appointed president and Chief officer of University College, Dublin (UCD), the youngest in UCD's history.

As president, Brady led a programme of change which included: academic restructuring, introduction of the UCD Horizons modular and semesterised undergraduate curriculum, overhaul of UCD's student supports, establishment of the Ad Astra Academy to nurture UCD's highest performing students, establishment of graduate schools and structured PhD programmes to support postgraduate training, creation of a number of thematic multi-disciplinary research institutes, a focus on internationalisation, adoption of innovation as the '3rd pillar' of UCD academic activity, the launch of a new visual identity for UCD, a new campus development plan and capital programme, enhancement of UCD's development and alumni relations functions, and launch of a new fundraising campaign. During his tenure, UCD also introduced independent chairs to UCD's Governing Authority and Finance Committees, and Brady invited the president of UCD's Students Union to join UCD's finance committee.

UCD expanded its on-campus international student population from 11% to 22% (of approximately 25,500 students) and grew its overseas programmes in China, Hong Kong, Singapore, and Malaysia to a student population of 5,000. UCD was invited to join the Universitas 21 network of global research universities. The university was granted approval by the Chinese Government to establish the Beijing-Dublin International College in 2011 and was awarded €3m by the Chinese Government in December 2013, towards the construction of a new building for the UCD Confucius Institute for Ireland on UCD's Belfield campus with matching funding from the Irish Government. In December 2013, Brady secured a commitment from Chinese authorities to provide facilities of circa €300 million for a new campus in Yantai City, Shandong Province to be run jointly by UCD and China Agricultural University (CAU).

=== Vice-Chancellor, University of Bristol (2015–2022) ===
In October 2014, it was announced that Brady would become vice-chancellor of the University of Bristol, and in September 2015, he was made vice-chancellor and president of the university, becoming the 13th vice-chancellor.

=== President, Imperial College London (2022-present) ===
Brady was named President of Imperial College London in September 2021, taking up post in August 2022.

=== Other roles ===
Brady has served in a number of external leadership roles, including as a member of the Republic of Ireland's Higher Education Authority, chairman of the Irish Health Research Board, chairman of the Irish Universities Association, president of the Irish Nephrological Society, and chairman of the Universitas 21 global network of global research universities. He also served on the Irish Government's National Innovation Taskforce in 2011 and the oversight committee for Ireland's National Innovation Fund.

He is a member of the Public Interest Board of PwC (Ireland) and a non-Executive Director of two multinational companies – Kerry Group plc and ICON plc. He received an Honorary Doctorate of Science from The Queen's University of Belfast, an Honorary Fellowship from the Royal College of Anaesthetists in Ireland and the Robert Menzies Medal from the University of Melbourne.

== Personal ==
Brady is married to Professor Yvonne O’Meara, a consultant nephrologist, and they have three sons.

Academic offices
Preceded by Art Cosgrove	President of the University College Dublin; 2004–2013	Succeeded by Andrew Deeks
Preceded by Eric Thomas	President and Vice-Chancellor of the University of Bristol; 2015–2022	Succeeded by Evelyn Welch
Preceded by Alice Gast	President of Imperial College London; 2022–present	Incumbent
