= Skorokhod's representation theorem =

Theorem

In mathematics and statistics, Skorokhod's representation theorem is a result that shows that a weakly convergent sequence of probability measures whose limit measure is sufficiently well-behaved can be represented as the distribution/law of a pointwise convergent sequence of random variables defined on a common probability space. It is named for the Ukrainian mathematician A. V. Skorokhod.

== Statement ==
Let $(\mu_n)_{n \in \mathbb{N}}$ be a sequence of probability measures on a metric space $S$ such that $\mu_n$ converges weakly to some probability measure $\mu_\infty$ on $S$ as $n \to \infty$. Suppose also that the support of $\mu_\infty$ is separable. Then there exist $S$-valued random variables $X_n$ defined on a common probability space $(\Omega,\mathcal{F},\mathbf{P})$ such that the law of $X_n$ is $\mu_n$ for all $n$ (including $n=\infty$) and such that $(X_n)_{n \in \mathbb{N}}$ converges to $X_\infty$, $\mathbf{P}$-almost surely.

== See also ==
- Convergence in distribution
