= Arthur Roderick Collar =

English scientist and engineer

Arthur Roderick Collar CBE FRS FREng

Vice-chancellor of the University of Bristol
- In office 1968–1969
- Preceded by: John E. Harris
- Succeeded by: Sir Alec Merrison

Personal details
- Born: 22 February 1908 West Ealing, England
- Died: 12 February 1986 (aged 77)
- Children: 2
- Education: Emmanuel College, Cambridge
- Profession: Scientist; Engineer

Arthur Roderick Collar CBE FRS FREng (22 February 1908 – 12 February 1986) was an English scientist and engineer who made significant contributions in the areas of aeroelasticity, matrix theory and its applications in engineering dynamics.

== Early life and education ==
Arthur Roderick Collar was born in West Ealing, England, on 22 February 1908, the son of Arthur Collar, owner of a firm of ironmongers and builders' merchants, and Louise Gann. He grew up in West Ealing and, from age five, in Whitstable. He attended the local board school and then spent eight years as a scholarship student at the Simon Langton School in Canterbury, where he won the school's highest award, the Payne Smith Medal and Prize, and excelled in mathematics, science, music, and sport. An accident during a school football match resulted in the lifelong loss of vision in his right eye. He then attended Emmanuel College, Cambridge, also on scholarship, from 1926 to 1929, where he studied both mathematics and physics.

== Career ==
After graduating from Cambridge, Collar joining the Aerodynamics Department at the National Physical Laboratory in Teddington, where he worked on propellers, airship dynamics, wind-tunnel design, and especially on flutter and matrix analysis. "It is for his research on the application of matrices to the solution of differential equations and dynamical problems", wrote R.E.D. Bishop in an account of Collar's life, "that Collar's period at N.P.L. Is best remembered." Collar worked on these challenges in collaboration with Robert Alexander Frazer and William Jolly Duncan. "The collaboration between these three", according to Bishop, "became so close that eventually separate attributions became virtually impossible to make."

From 1936 to 1980, Collar was an active member of the Aeronautical Research Committee (later Council), serving in various roles on the Council and its subcommittees; from 1964 to 1968 he was its chairman. During World War II, Collar led an aeroelasticity research team at the Royal Aircraft Establishment in Farnborough, where according to Bishop the "main work of Collar's section was to try to alleviate or prevent the adverse effects of elastic distortion in aircraft – those of loss of control, vibration and flutter."

After the war Collar "visited German research establishments and scientists", according to Bishop, to exchange information about new advances in aeronautics. In 1946, Collar was appointed to the newly established Sir George White Chair of Aeronautical Engineering at Bristol University. While at Bristol, he served as Dean of the Engineering Faculty from 1954 to 1957, and in 1968–69 acted as Vice-Chancellor. Bishop describes him as a "remarkably successful" administrator who had a "positive love of productive committee work" and an "urbane and thoroughly informed approach" to such work. He was made an honorary Doctorate of Laws in 1969 and retired in 1973, becoming Professor Emeritus.

== Other professional activities ==
Collar was Chairman of Council of Rolls-Royce Technical College from 1969 to 1983. He also was on the Advisory Council of the Royal Military College of Science at Shrivenham from 1964 to 1980, and chairman of the Council from 1970 to 1978. He belonged to the Clifton College Council from 1969 to 1979, was on the Council of the Royal Society from 1971 to 1973, and was on the Academic Advisory Council of Cranfield Institute of Technology from 1970 to 1975. He was a Governor of United Bristol Hospital from 1968 to 1974 and a member of the Southwest Regional Hospital Board from 1969 to 1974.

== Books and other publications ==
Collar's book Elementary Matrices and Some Applications to Dynamics and Differential Equations, written with Robert Alexander Frazer and William Jolly Duncan and published in 1938, quickly became a standard text in the field and is described as a "classic" in The Schur Complement and Its Applications by Fuzhen Zhang. Bishop calls it a "masterpiece", noting its many reprintings over several decades in Britain and the United States and its translations into other languages.

He also wrote A Criterion for the Prevention of Spring-Tab Flutter, published by the Aeronautical Research Council. His book Matrices and Engineering Dynamics, written with A. Simpson, was published posthumously.

Collar published 23 papers in the R & M Series, and his paper "The expanding domain of aeroelasticity" was described as "'a chart and a compass' for all future aeroelastic work".

== Honours and awards ==
Collar and D. H. Williams jointly won the R38 Memorial Prize of the Royal Aeronautical Society in 1932 when he was 24. He won the George Taylor Gold Medal in 1947, the Orville Wright Prize in 1958, and the J. E. Hodgson Prize in 1960.

Collar was named a fellow of the Royal Aeronautical Society in 1944, serving as its president from 1963 to 1964. He was the first academic to become president of the society while still holding academic office. He won the society's Gold Medal in 1966 and its Hodgkin Prize in 1979. He was made a Commander of the Order of the British Empire in 1964 and was elected to the Fellowship of the Royal Society in 1965.

Bishop notes that Collar "achieved the unusual distinction of triple Honorary Fellowship of the Royal Aeronautical Society, the Canadian Aeronautics and Space Institute (1980), and the American Institute of Aeronautics and Astronautics (1984)."

Collar was invited to give the Lanchester Memorial Lecture in 1958. In 1971, he was awarded an Honorary Degree (Doctor of Science) by the University of Bath.

== Personal life ==
Collar married Winifred Margaret Charlotte (Bobbie) Moorman in June 1934. They had two sons, Martin and Nigel. Bobbie died in 1986.

Collar, according to Bishop, "was an active member of the Church of England, who could be described accurately as gentle but tough. His was essentially a Christian outlook that stood him in particularly good stead in times of difficulty. In short, he was a born leader, though he was by no means instrusive." He also describes Collar as "a very entertaining raconteur....In general conversation...there was rarely a dull moment and he had a great fund of quotations, particularly from W. S. Gilbert." Also, "he was an excellent speaker with an enviable gift of spontaneity." His colleagues, furthermore, credited Collar with helping them to write better English.

Bishop notes that Collar's outside interests "were both substantial and numerous", including "games and puzzles, reading, poetry, music and....watching tennis, football (of both varieties) and cricket."

Professional and academic associations
Preceded by Beverley Shenstone	President of the Royal Aeronautical Society; 1963–64	Succeeded by Henry Gardner (engineer)
Academic offices
Preceded by John E. Harris	Vice-Chancellor of the University of Bristol; 1968–69	Succeeded by Sir Alec Merrison
