= M/G/1 queue =

Aspect of queueing theory

In queueing theory, a discipline within the mathematical theory of probability, an M/G/1 queue is a queue model where arrivals are Markovian (modulated by a Poisson process), service times have a General distribution and there is a single server. The model name is written in Kendall's notation, and is an extension of the M/M/1 queue, where service times must be exponentially distributed. The classic application of the M/G/1 queue is to model performance of a fixed head hard disk.

== Model definition ==
A queue represented by a M/G/1 queue is a stochastic process whose state space is the set {0,1,2,3...}, where the value corresponds to the number of customers in the queue, including any being served. Transitions from state i to i + 1 represent the arrival of a new customer: the times between such arrivals have an exponential distribution with parameter λ. Transitions from state i to i − 1 represent a customer who has been served, finishing being served and departing: the length of time required for serving an individual customer has a general distribution function. The lengths of times between arrivals and of service periods are random variables which are assumed to be statistically independent.

=== Scheduling policies ===
Customers are typically served on a first-come, first-served basis, other popular scheduling policies include

- processor sharing where all jobs in the queue share the service capacity between them equally
- last-come, first served without preemption where a job in service cannot be interrupted
- last-come, first served with preemption where a job in service is interrupted by later arrivals, but work is conserved
- generalized foreground-background (FB) scheduling also known as least-attained-service where the jobs which have received least processing time so far are served first and jobs which have received equal service time share service capacity using processor sharing
- shortest job first without preemption (SJF) where the job with the smallest size receives service and cannot be interrupted until service completes
- preemptive shortest job first where at any moment in time the job with the smallest original size is served
- shortest remaining processing time (SRPT) where the next job to serve is that with the smallest remaining processing requirement

Service policies are often evaluated by comparing the mean sojourn time in the queue. If service times that jobs require are known on arrival then the optimal scheduling policy is SRPT.

Policies can also be evaluated using a measure of fairness.

== Queue length ==
=== Pollaczek–Khinchine method ===
The probability generating function of the stationary queue length distribution is given by the Pollaczek–Khinchine transform equation

$$\pi(z) = \frac{(1-z)(1-\rho)g(\lambda(1-z))}{g(\lambda(1-z))-z}$$

where g(s) is the Laplace transform of the service time probability density function. In the case of an M/M/1 queue where service times are exponentially distributed with parameter μ, g(s) = μ/(μ + s).

This can be solved for individual state probabilities either using by direct computation or using the method of supplementary variables. The Pollaczek–Khinchine formula gives the mean queue length and mean waiting time in the system.

=== Matrix analytic method ===
Consider the embedded Markov chain of the M/G/1 queue, where the time points selected are immediately after the moment of departure. The customer being served (if there is one) has received zero seconds of service. Between departures, there can be 0, 1, 2, 3,... arrivals. So from state i the chain can move to state i – 1, i, i + 1, i + 2, .... The embedded Markov chain has transition matrix

$$P = \begin{pmatrix}
a_0 & a_1 & a_2 & a_3 & a_4 & \cdots \\
a_0 & a_1 & a_2 & a_3 & a_4 & \cdots \\
0   & a_0 & a_1 & a_2 & a_3 & \cdots \\
0   & 0   & a_0 & a_1 & a_2 & \cdots \\
0   & 0   & 0   & a_0 & a_1 & \cdots \\
\vdots & \vdots & \vdots & \vdots & \vdots & \ddots
\end{pmatrix}$$

where

$$a_v = \int_0^\infty e^{-\lambda u} \frac{(\lambda u)^v}{v!} \text{d}F(u) ~\text{ for } v \geq 0$$

and F(u) is the service time distribution and λ the Poisson arrival rate of jobs to the queue.

Markov chains with generator matrices or block matrices of this form are called M/G/1 type Markov chains, a term coined by Marcel F. Neuts.

An M/G/1 queue has a stationary distribution if and only if the traffic intensity $\rho=\lambda \mathbb{E}(G)$ is less than 1, in which case the unique such distribution has probability-generating function:

$$G(s)=\frac{(1-\rho)(1-s)}{1-s/M_S(\lambda(s-1))}$$

where $M_S$ is the moment-generating function of a general service time. The stationary distribution of an M/G/1 type Markov model can be computed using the matrix analytic method.

== Busy period ==
The busy period is the time spent in states $1, 2, 3,...$ between visits to the state $0$. The expected length of a busy period is $\dfrac{1}{\mu - \lambda}$ where $\dfrac{1}{\mu}$ is the expected length of service time and $\lambda$ the rate of the Poisson process governing arrivals. Let $\phi(s)$ denote the Laplace transform of the busy period probability density function (so $\phi(s)$ is also the Laplace–Stieltjes transform of the busy period cumulative distribution function). Then $\phi(s)$ can be shown to obey the Kendall functional equation

$$\phi(s) = g[s+\lambda - \lambda \phi(s)]$$

where as above $g$ is the Laplace–Stieltjes transform of the service time distribution function. This relationship can only be solved exactly in special cases (such as the M/M/1 queue), but for any $s$ the value of $\phi(s)$ can be calculated and by iteration with upper and lower bounds the distribution function numerically computed.

== Sojourn time ==
Writing S^{*}(s) for the Laplace–Stieltjes transform of the sojourn time distribution, is given by the Pollaczek–Khinchine transform as

$$S^\ast(s) = \frac{(1-\rho)sg(s) }{s-\lambda(1-g(s))}$$

where g(s) is the Laplace–Stieltjes transform of service time probability density function.

== Waiting/response time ==
Writing W^{*}(s) for the Laplace–Stieltjes transform of the waiting time distribution, is given by the Pollaczek–Khinchine transform as

$$W^\ast(s) = \frac{(1-\rho)s }{s-\lambda(1-g(s))}$$

where g(s) is the Laplace–Stieltjes transform of service time probability density function.

== Arrival theorem ==
As the arrivals are determined by a Poisson process, the arrival theorem holds.

== Multiple servers ==
Many metrics for the M/G/k queue with k servers remain an open problem, though some approximations and bounds are known.

== See also ==
- M/M/1 queue
- M/M/c queue
