= M/M/c queue =

Multi-server queueing model

In queueing theory, a discipline within the mathematical theory of probability, the M/M/c queue (or Erlang–C model) is a multi-server queueing model. In Kendall's notation it describes a system where arrivals form a single queue and are governed by a Poisson process, there are c servers, and job service times are exponentially distributed. It is a generalisation of the M/M/1 queue which considers only a single server. The model with infinitely many servers is the M/M/∞ queue.

== Model definition ==
An M/M/c queue is a stochastic process whose state space is the set {0, 1, 2, 3, ...} where the value corresponds to the number of customers in the system, including any currently in service.

- Arrivals occur at rate λ according to a Poisson process and move the process from state i to i+1.
- Service times have an exponential distribution with parameter μ. If there are fewer than c jobs, some of the servers will be idle. If there are more than c jobs, the jobs queue in a buffer.
- The buffer is of infinite size, so there is no limit on the number of customers it can contain.

The model can be described as a continuous time Markov chain with transition rate matrix

$$Q=\begin{pmatrix}
-\lambda & \lambda \\
\mu & -(\mu+\lambda) & \lambda \\
&2\mu & -(2\mu+\lambda) & \lambda \\
&&3\mu & -(3\mu+\lambda) & \lambda \\
&&&&\ddots\\
&&&&c\mu & -(c\mu+\lambda) & \lambda \\
&&&&&c\mu & -(c\mu+\lambda) & \lambda \\
&&&&&&c\mu & -(c\mu+\lambda) & \lambda \\
&&&&&&&\ddots\\
\end{pmatrix}$$

on the state space {0, 1, 2, 3, ...}. The model is a type of birth–death process. We write ρ = λ/(c μ) for the server utilization and require ρ < 1 for the queue to be stable. ρ represents the average proportion of time which each of the servers is occupied (assuming jobs finding more than one vacant server choose their servers randomly).

The state space diagram for this chain is as below.

== Stationary analysis ==
=== Number of customers in the system ===
If the traffic intensity is greater than one then the queue will grow without bound but if server utilization $\rho = \frac{\lambda}{c\mu} < 1$ then the system has a stationary distribution with probability mass function

$\pi_0 = \left[\left(\sum_{k=0}^{c-1}\frac{(c\rho)^k}{k!} \right) + \frac{(c\rho)^c}{c!}\frac{1}{1-\rho}\right]^{-1}$
$$\pi_k = \begin{cases}
\pi_0\dfrac{(c\rho)^k}{k!},  & \mbox{if }0 < k < c \\[10pt]
\pi_0\dfrac{(c\rho)^k c^{c-k}}{c!}, & \mbox{if } c \le k
\end{cases}$$

where π_{k} is the probability that the system contains k customers.

The probability that an arriving customer is forced to join the queue (all servers are occupied) is given by

$\text{ C}(c,\lambda/\mu)=\frac{\left( \frac{(c\rho)^c}{c!}\right) \left( \frac{1}{1-\rho} \right)}{\sum_{k=0}^{c-1} \frac{(c\rho)^k}{k!} + \left( \frac{(c\rho)^c}{c!} \right) \left( \frac{1}{1-\rho} \right)}=\frac{1}{1+\left( 1-\rho \right) \left( \frac{c!}{(c\rho)^c} \right) \sum_{k=0}^{c-1} \frac{(c\rho)^k}{k!}}$

which is referred to as Erlang's C formula and is often denoted C(c, λ/μ) or E_{2,c}(λ/μ). The average number of customers in the system (in service and in the queue) is given by

$\frac{\rho}{1-\rho} \text{ C}(c,\lambda/\mu) + c \rho.$

=== Busy period of server ===
The busy period of the M/M/c queue can either refer to:

- full busy period: the time period between an arrival which finds c−1 customers in the system until a departure which leaves the system with c−1 customers
- partial busy period: the time period between an arrival which finds the system empty until a departure which leaves the system again empty.

Write T_{k} = min( t: k jobs in the system at time 0^{+} and k − 1 jobs in the system at time t) and η_{k}(s) for the Laplace–Stieltjes transform of the distribution of T_{k}. Then

1. For k > c, T_{k} has the same distribution as T_{c}.
2. For k = c,
  $\eta_c(s) = \frac{c \mu}{k \mu + s + \lambda-\lambda \eta_{c}(s)}.$
3. For k < c,
  $\eta_k(s) = \frac{k \mu}{k \mu + s + \lambda-\lambda \eta_{k+1}(s)}.$

=== Response time ===
The response time is the total amount of time a customer spends in both the queue and in service. The average response time is the same for all work conserving service disciplines and is

$\frac{\text{ C}(c,\lambda/\mu)}{c \mu - \lambda} + \frac{1}{\mu}.$

==== Customers in first-come, first-served discipline ====
The customer either experiences an immediate exponential service, or must wait for k customers to be served before their own service, thus experiencing an Erlang distribution with shape parameter k + 1.

==== Customers in processor sharing discipline ====
In a processor sharing queue the service capacity of the queue is split equally between the jobs in the queue. In the M/M/c queue this means that when there are c or fewer jobs in the system, each job is serviced at rate μ. However, when there are more than c jobs in the system the service rate of each job decreases and is $\frac{c\mu}{n}$ where n is the number of jobs in the system. This means that arrivals after a job of interest can impact the service time of the job of interest. The Laplace–Stieltjes transform of the response time distribution has been shown to be a solution to a Volterra integral equation from which moments can be computed. An approximation has been offered for the response time distribution.

== Finite capacity ==
In an M/M/c/K queue only K customers can queue at any one time (including those in service). Any further arrivals to the queue are considered "lost". We assume that K ≥ c. The model has transition rate matrix

$$Q=\begin{pmatrix}
-\lambda & \lambda \\
\mu & -(\mu+\lambda) & \lambda \\
&2\mu & -(2\mu+\lambda) & \lambda \\
&&3\mu & -(3\mu+\lambda) & \lambda \\
&&&&\ddots\\
&&&&c\mu & -(c\mu+\lambda) & \lambda \\
&&&&&c\mu & -(c\mu+\lambda) & \lambda \\
&&&&&&&\ddots\\
&&&&&&&c\mu & -(c\mu) \\
\end{pmatrix}$$

on the state space {0, 1, 2, ..., c, ..., K}. In the case where c = K, the M/M/c/c queue is also known as the Erlang-B model.

=== Transient analysis ===
See Takács for a transient solution and Stadje for busy period results.

=== Stationary analysis ===
Stationary probabilities are given by

$\pi_0 = \left[\sum_{k=0}^{c} \frac{\lambda^k}{\mu^k k!} + \frac{\lambda^c}{\mu^c c!}\sum_{k=c+1}^K \frac{\lambda^{k-c}}{\mu^{k-c} c^{k-c}}\right]^{-1}$
$$\pi_k = \begin{cases}
\frac{(\lambda/\mu)^k}{k!}\pi_0 & \text{for } k=1,2,\ldots,c \\
\frac{(\lambda/\mu)^k}{c^{k-c} c!}\pi_0 & \text{for } k=c+1,\ldots,K.
\end{cases}$$

The average number of customers in the system is

$L = \frac{\lambda}{\mu} + \pi_0 \frac{\rho (c\rho)^c}{(1-\rho)^2 c!}$

and the average time in the system for a customer is

$W = \frac{1}{\mu} + \pi_0 \frac{\rho (c\rho)^c}{\lambda (1-\rho)^2 c!}$

The average time in the queue for a customer is

$W_q = \pi_0 \frac{\rho (c\rho)^c}{\lambda (1-\rho)^2 c!}$

The average number of customers in the queue can be obtained by using the effective arrival rate. The effective arrival rate is calculated by

$\mathbb{\lambda_a} = \lambda(1-p_K)$

Thus we can obtain the average number of customers in the queue by

$L_q = \lambda_a W_q$

== Heavy-traffic limits ==
Writing X(t) for the number of customers in the system at time t, it can be shown that under three different conditions the process

$\hat X_n(t) = \frac{X(nt) - \mathbb E(X(nt))}{\sqrt{n}}$

converges to a diffusion process.

1. Fix μ and c, increase λ and scale by n = 1/(1 − ρ)^{2}.
2. Fix μ and ρ, increase λ and c, and scale by n = c.
3. Fix as a constant β where
  $\beta = (1-\rho)\sqrt{s}$

and increase λ and c using the scale n = c or n = 1/(1 − ρ)^{2}. This case is called the Halfin–Whitt regime.

== See also ==
- Spectral expansion solution
- M/G/k queue
