= John Kingman =

British mathematician (born 1939)

Sir John Kingman FRS

Vice-Chancellor of the University of Bristol
- In office 1985–2001
- Preceded by: Peter Haggett (acting); Alec Merrison
- Succeeded by: Sir Eric Thomas

Personal details
- Born: John Frank Charles Kingman; 28 August 1939 (age 87) Beckenham, Kent, England
- Spouse: Valerie Cromwell (m. 1964–2018)
- Children: John Oliver Frank Kingman
- Known for: Coalescent theory Heavy traffic approximation Kingman's formula Kingman's subadditive ergodic theorem
- Awards: Smith's Prize (1962); Berwick Prize (1967); Guy Medal (Silver, 1981) (Gold, 2013); Royal Medal (1983); Knight Bachelor (1985)
- Scientific career
- Education: Christ's College, Finchley
- Alma mater: University of Cambridge (BA)
- Fields: Mathematics
- Workplaces: University of Sussex (1965–69); University of Oxford (1969–85); Science and Engineering Research Council (1981–85); University of Bristol (1985–2001); University of Cambridge (2001–06)
- Doctoral advisor: Peter Whittle; David Kendall (PhD not completed)
- Doctoral students: Peter Donnelly; Peter Gavin Hall; Wilfrid S. Kendall

Sir John Frank Charles Kingman FRS (born 28 August 1939) is a British mathematician. He served as N. M. Rothschild and Sons Professor of Mathematical Sciences and Director of the Isaac Newton Institute at the University of Cambridge from 2001 until 2006, when he was succeeded by David Wallace. He is known for developing the mathematics of the coalescent theory, a theoretical model of inheritance that is fundamental to modern population genetics.

== Education and early life ==
The grandson of a coal miner and son of a government scientist with a PhD in chemistry, Kingman was born in Beckenham, Kent, and grew up in the outskirts of London, where he attended Christ's College, Finchley, which was then a state grammar school. He was awarded a scholarship to read mathematics at Pembroke College, Cambridge, in 1956. On graduating in 1960, he began work on his PhD under the supervision of Peter Whittle, studying queueing theory, Markov chains and regenerative phenomena.

== Career and research ==
Whittle left Cambridge for the University of Manchester, and, rather than follow him there, Kingman moved instead to the University of Oxford, where he resumed his work under David Kendall. After another year, Kendall was appointed a professor at Cambridge and so Kingman returned to Cambridge. He returned, however, as a member of the teaching staff (and a Fellow of Pembroke College) and never completed his PhD. He married Valerie Cromwell, a historian at the University of Sussex in 1964, and in 1965 he took up the post of Reader at the newly built University of Sussex where she was teaching, and was elected Professor of Mathematics and Statistics after only a year. He said of this post:

Sussex in the 1960s was a very exciting place, alive with ideas and opportunities. My wife was teaching history there, and we made many friends across the whole range of subjects.

He held this post until 1969, when he moved, figuratively, but not physically, to Oxford as Wallis Professor of Mathematics, a position he held until 1985. He has said of this appointment:

Statistics in Oxford in 1969 was frankly a mess. There was no professor of statistics, the only chair having been abolished some years before...[Maurice Bartlett and] I conspired to persuade Oxford to take statistics seriously.

During his time at Oxford, as well as holding a Fellowship at St Anne's College from 1978 to 1985, Kingman also chaired the Science and Engineering Research Council (now the Engineering and Physical Sciences Research Council (EPSRC)) from 1981 to 1985, was vice-president of the Institute of Statisticians from 1978 until 1992 and held visiting appointments at the University of Western Australia (1974) and the Australian National University (1978). It was also during this time that Kingman developed the theory of the Coalescent or Coalescent theory, a backwards-in-time theory of individuals in historical populations that, because it greatly simplifies computation, underlies much of modern population genomics.

From October 1985, Kingman was elected Vice-Chancellor of the University of Bristol. He remained in Bristol until 2001 when he took up his post at the Isaac Newton Institute in Cambridge. Shortly after making that move, Kingman drew some media attention for having the third-highest salary among British Vice-Chancellors and this having nearly doubled in his final year in the job, at a time when most academics received pay-rises of about 3%. Whilst at Bristol, he also served in a number of other capacities. In the academic field, he was president of the Royal Statistical Society from 1987 to 1989, and president of the London Mathematical Society from 1990 to 1992. In public service, he was a member of the board of the British Council between 1986 and 1991 and was on the Board of the British Technology Group from 1986 until after it was privatised in 1992. He also held directorships at a number of industrial companies, including IBM from 1985 to 1995 and SmithKline Beecham from 1986 to 1989. In 1987–88, Kingman chaired the Committee of Inquiry into the teaching of the English language. In 2000 the Chancellor of the Exchequer appointed Sir John the first chairman of the Statistics Commission, the body that oversees the work of the Office for National Statistics, the UK government's statistics agency. In 2002 Kingman attracted some media attention by telling the House of Commons Treasury Select Committee that the 2011 UK Census could be conducted using new technology rather than the traditional headcount, or even not conducted at all.

== Honors and awards ==
In 1985 Kingman was knighted by Queen Elizabeth II for his work with the Science and Engineering Research Council. Kingman holds honorary degrees from the University of Sussex, The University of Southampton, the University of Bristol, the University of the West of England, and Queen's University (Ontario). The London Mathematical Society awarded Kingman its Berwick Prize in 1967. Kingman was elected a Fellow of the Royal Society (FRS) in 1971, later receiving its Royal Medal in 1983 "[i]n recognition of his distinguished researches on queuing theory, on regenerative phenomena, and on mathematical genetics". He was also awarded the Guy Medal in silver by the Royal Statistical Society in 1981.

== Personal life ==
He married Valerie Cromwell in 1964. They had two children, including John Oliver Frank Kingman. Lady Kingman died in 2018.

== Bibliography ==
- Kingman, J. F. C.; Taylor, S. J. (1966). Introduction to Measure and Probability. Cambridge University Press.
- Kingman, J. F. C. (1966). On the Algebra of Queues. Methuen. ASIN B0007ILKPE.
- Kingman, J. F. C. (1972). Regenerative Phenomena. John Wiley and Sons Ltd. ISBN 0-471-47905-5.
- Kingman, J. F. C. (1980). Mathematics of Genetic Diversity. Society for Industrial and Applied Mathematics. ISBN 0-89871-166-5.
- Kingman, J. F. C. (1993). Poisson Processes. Oxford University Press. ISBN 0-19-853693-3.

Preceded by Peter Haggett (acting); Alec Merrison	Vice-Chancellor of the University of Bristol; 1985–2001	Succeeded by Eric Thomas
