= Markovian arrival process =

Mathematical model in queueing theory

In queueing theory, a discipline within the mathematical theory of probability, a Markovian arrival process (MAP or MArP) is a mathematical model for the time between job arrivals to a system. The simplest such process is a Poisson process where the time between each arrival is exponentially distributed.

The processes were first suggested by Marcel F. Neuts in 1979.

== Definition ==
A Markov arrival process is defined by two matrices, D_{0} and D_{1} where elements of D_{0} represent hidden transitions and elements of D_{1} observable transitions. The block matrix Q below is a transition rate matrix for a continuous-time Markov chain.

$$Q=\left[\begin{matrix}
D_{0}&D_{1}&0&0&\dots\\
0&D_{0}&D_{1}&0&\dots\\
0&0&D_{0}&D_{1}&\dots\\
\vdots & \vdots & \ddots & \ddots & \ddots
\end{matrix}\right]\; .$$

The simplest example is a Poisson process where D_{0} = −λ and D_{1} = λ where there is only one possible transition, it is observable, and occurs at rate λ. For Q to be a valid transition rate matrix, the following restrictions apply to the D_{i}

$$\begin{align}
0\leq [D_{1}]_{i,j}&<\infty \\
0\leq [D_{0}]_{i,j}&<\infty \quad i\neq j \\
\, [D_{0}]_{i,i}&<0 \\
(D_{0}+D_{1})\boldsymbol{1} &= \boldsymbol{0}
\end{align}$$

== Special cases ==
=== Phase-type renewal process ===
The phase-type renewal process is a Markov arrival process with phase-type distributed sojourn between arrivals. For example, if an arrival process has an interarrival time distribution PH$(\boldsymbol{\alpha},S)$ with an exit vector denoted $\boldsymbol{S}^{0}=-S\boldsymbol{1}$, the arrival process has generator matrix,

$$Q=\left[\begin{matrix}
S&\boldsymbol{S}^{0}\boldsymbol{\alpha}&0&0&\dots\\
0&S&\boldsymbol{S}^{0}\boldsymbol{\alpha}&0&\dots\\
0&0&S&\boldsymbol{S}^{0}\boldsymbol{\alpha}&\dots\\
\vdots&\vdots&\ddots&\ddots&\ddots\\
\end{matrix}\right]$$

== Generalizations ==
=== Batch Markov arrival process ===
The batch Markovian arrival process (BMAP) is a generalisation of the Markovian arrival process by allowing more than one arrival at a time. The homogeneous case has rate matrix,

$$Q=\left[\begin{matrix}
D_{0}&D_{1}&D_{2}&D_{3}&\dots\\
0&D_{0}&D_{1}&D_{2}&\dots\\
0&0&D_{0}&D_{1}&\dots\\
\vdots & \vdots & \ddots & \ddots & \ddots
\end{matrix}\right]\; .$$

An arrival of size $k$ occurs every time a transition occurs in the sub-matrix $D_{k}$. Sub-matrices $D_{k}$ have elements of $\lambda_{i,j}$, the rate of a Poisson process, such that,

$$0\leq [D_{k}]_{i,j}<\infty\;\;\;\; 1\leq k$$

$$0\leq [D_{0}]_{i,j}<\infty\;\;\;\; i\neq j$$

$$[D_{0}]_{i,i}<0\;$$

and

$$\sum^{\infty}_{k=0}D_{k}\boldsymbol{1}=\boldsymbol{0}$$

=== Markov-modulated Poisson process ===
The Markov-modulated Poisson process or MMPP where m Poisson processes are switched between by an underlying continuous-time Markov chain. If each of the m Poisson processes has rate λ_{i} and the modulating continuous-time Markov has m × m transition rate matrix R, then the MAP representation is

$$\begin{align}
D_{1} &= \operatorname{diag}\{\lambda_{1},\dots,\lambda_{m}\}\\
D_{0} &=R-D_1.
\end{align}$$

== Fitting ==
A MAP can be fitted using an expectation–maximization algorithm.

=== Software ===
- KPC-toolbox a library of MATLAB scripts to fit a MAP to data.

== See also ==
- Rational arrival process
