= Peter Haggett =

British geographer and academic (1933–2025)

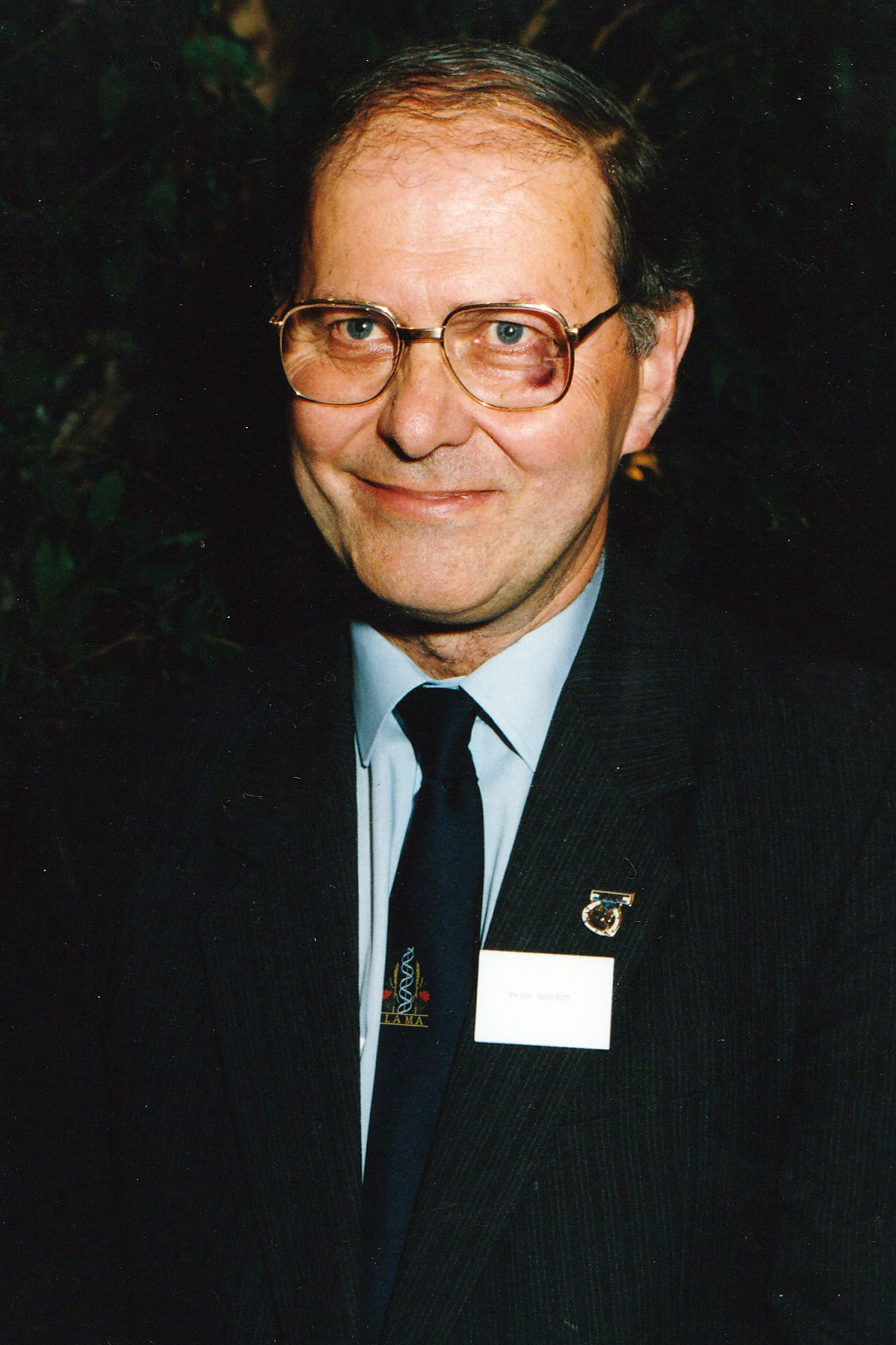
- Haggett in 1991
- Born: 24 January 1933; Pawlett, Somerset, England
- Died: 9 February 2025 (aged 92)
- Education: University of Cambridge
- Scientific career
- Institutions: University of Bristol

Peter Haggett CBE (24 January 1933 – 9 February 2025) was a British geographer and academic, Professor Emeritus and Senior Research Fellow in Urban and Regional Geography at the School of Geographical Sciences, University of Bristol.

== Life and career ==
Haggett was born in the rural Somerset village of Pawlett on 24 January 1933. He was educated at Dr Morgan's Grammar School in Bridgwater. He would later credit the time spent in his childhood walking and cycling around the district with the development of his keen interest in geography.

In 1951 he became an undergraduate at St. Catharine's College, Cambridge, where he read Geography. Peter Hall (later Sir Peter), the noted urban geographer, was one of his contemporaries. Haggett graduated in 1954, obtaining a "Double First" (First-Class Honours in parts I and II of the Tripos).

In an academic career spanning half a century, Haggett is noted for his significant research contributions to the field of human geography, and was the author or editor of over 30 books on geographical practice, theory and individual research topics. He held numerous teaching posts and visiting professorships at institutions around the world, but is most particularly associated with the University of Bristol where he was a lecturer and professor of geography from 1966. Among the many awards and distinguished recognitions conferred, Haggett was awarded the French Lauréat Prix International de Géographie Vautrin Lud in 1991, and made a Commander of the Order of the British Empire in the 1993 Birthday Honours, for "services to urban and regional geography".

Haggett is known to have been offered many prestigious academic positions, but has preferred to specialise in the geographical study of epidemiology and the spatial relationships and distribution of infectious diseases for the latter half of his career.

Haggett died on 9 February 2025, at the age of 92.
