= Quasireversibility =

In queueing theory, a discipline within the mathematical theory of probability, quasireversibility (sometimes QR) is a property of some queues. The concept was first identified by Richard R. Muntz and further developed by Frank Kelly. Quasireversibility differs from reversibility in that a stronger condition is imposed on arrival rates and a weaker condition is applied on probability fluxes. For example, an M/M/1 queue with state-dependent arrival rates and state-dependent service times is reversible, but not quasireversible.

A network of queues, such that each individual queue when considered in isolation is quasireversible, always has a product form stationary distribution. Quasireversibility had been conjectured to be a necessary condition for a product form solution in a queueing network, but this was shown not to be the case. Chao et al. exhibited a product form network where quasireversibility was not satisfied.

== Definition ==
A queue with stationary distribution $\pi$ is quasireversible if its state at time t, x(t) is independent of

- the arrival times for each class of customer subsequent to time t,
- the departure times for each class of customer prior to time t

for all classes of customer.

== Partial balance formulation ==
Quasireversibility is equivalent to a particular form of partial balance. First, define the reversed rates q'(x,x') by

$$\pi(\mathbf x)q'(\mathbf x,\mathbf{x'}) = \pi(\mathbf{x'})q(\mathbf{x'},\mathbf x)$$

then considering just customers of a particular class, the arrival and departure processes are the same Poisson process (with parameter $\alpha$), so

$$\alpha = \sum_{\mathbf{x'} \in M_{\mathbf x}} q(\mathbf x,\mathbf{x'}) = \sum_{\mathbf{x'} \in M_{\mathbf x}} q'(\mathbf x,\mathbf{x'})$$

where M_{x} is a set such that $\scriptstyle{\mathbf{x'} \in M_{\mathbf x}}$ means the state x' represents a single arrival of the particular class of customer to state x.

== Examples ==
- Burke's theorem shows that an M/M/m queueing system is quasireversible.
- Kelly showed that each station of a BCMP network is quasireversible when viewed in isolation.
- G-queues in G-networks are quasireversible.

== See also ==
- Time reversibility
