= Kelly network =

In queueing theory, a discipline within the mathematical theory of probability, a Kelly network is a general multiclass queueing network. In the network each node is quasireversible and the network has a product-form stationary distribution, much like the single-class Jackson network.

The model is named after Frank Kelly who first introduced the model in 1975 in his paper Networks of Queues with Customers of Different Types.
