= Peter G. Harrison =

Peter Harrison
- Born: 1951 (age 74–75); Nottingham
- Citizenship: British
- Education: University of Cambridge; Imperial College London
- Known for: RCAT
- Awards: Mayhew Prize (1973)
- Scientific career
- Fields: performance analysis
- Workplaces: Imperial College London
- Thesis: Representative Queueing Network Models of Computer Systems in Terms of Time Delay Probability Distributions (1979)
- Doctoral advisor: Meir M. Lehman
- Doctoral students: Edwige Pitel

Peter George Harrison (born 1951) is an Emeritus Professor of Computing Science at Imperial College London known for the reversed compound agent theorem, which gives conditions for a stochastic network to have a product-form solution.

Harrison attended Christ's College, Cambridge, where he was a Wrangler in Mathematics (1972) and gained a Distinction in Part III of the Mathematical Tripos (1973), winning the Mayhew Prize for Applied Mathematics.

After spending two years in industry, Harrison moved to Imperial College, London where he has worked since, obtaining his Ph.D. in Computing Science in 1979 with a thesis titled "Representative queueing network models of computer systems in terms of time delay probability distributions" and lecturing since 1983.

Current research interests include parallel algorithms, performance engineering, queueing theory, stochastic models and stochastic process algebra, particularly the application of RCAT to find product-form solutions.

Harrison has coauthored two books, Functional Programming with Tony Field, and Performance Modelling of Communication Networks and Computer Architectures with Naresh Patel and published over 150 papers.

Harrison is an associate editor of The Computer Journal.

Via Saharon Shelah and Dov Gabbay, Harrison has an Erdős number of 3.
