= Mean value analysis =

In queueing theory, a discipline within the mathematical theory of probability, mean value analysis (MVA) is a recursive technique for computing expected queue lengths, waiting time at queueing nodes and throughput in equilibrium for a closed separable system of queues. The first approximate techniques were published independently by Schweitzer and Bard, followed later by an exact version by Lavenberg and Reiser published in 1980.

It is based on the arrival theorem, which states that when one customer in an M-customer closed system arrives at a service facility he/she observes the rest of the system to be in the equilibrium state for a system with M − 1 customers.

== Problem setup ==
Consider a closed queueing network of K M/M/1 queues, with M customers circulating in the system. Suppose that the customers are indistinguishable from each other, so that the network has a single class of customers. To compute the mean queue length and waiting time at each of the nodes and throughput of the system we use an iterative algorithm starting with a network with 0 customers.

Write μ_{i} for the service rate at node i and P for the customer routing matrix where element p_{ij} denotes the probability that a customer finishing service at node i moves to node j for service. To use the algorithm, we first compute the visit ratio row vector v, a vector such that v = v P.

Now write L_{i}(n) for the mean number of customers at queue i when there is a total of n customers in the system (this includes the job currently being served at queue i) and W_{j}(n) for the mean time spent by a customer in queue i when there is a total of n customers in the system. Denote the throughput of a system with m customers by λ_{m}.

== Algorithm ==
The algorithm starts with an empty network (zero customers), then increases the number of customers by 1 at each iteration until there are the required number (M) of customers in the system.

To initialise, set L_{k}(0) = 0 for k = 1,...,K. (This sets the average queue length in a system with no customers to zero at all nodes.)

Repeat for m = 1,...,M:

1. For k = 1, ..., K compute the waiting time at each node using the arrival theorem:

$$W_k(m) = \frac{1+L_k\left(m-1\right)}{\mu_k}.$$

2. Then compute the system throughput using Little's law:

$$\lambda_m=\frac{m}{\sum_{k=1}^K W_k(m) v_k}.$$

3. Finally, use Little's law applied to each queue to compute the mean queue lengths for k = 1, ..., K:

$$L_k(m)=v_k \lambda_m W_k(m).$$

End repeat.

== Bard–Schweitzer method ==
The Bard–Schweitzer approximation estimates the average number of jobs at node k to be:

$$L_k(m-1) \approx \frac{m-1}{m} L_k(m)$$

which is a linear interpolation. From the above formulas, this approximation yields fixed-point relationships which can be solved numerically. This iterative approach often goes under the name of approximate MVA (AMVA) and it is typically faster than the recursive approach of MVA.

=== Pseudocode ===
set L_{k}(m) = M/K

repeat until convergence:

$$\lambda_m = \frac{m}{\sum_{k=1}^K \frac{\frac{m-1}{m}L_k(m) + 1}{\mu_k} v_k}$$
$$L_k(m) = v_k \lambda_m \frac{\frac{m-1}{m}L_k(m) + 1}{\mu_k}$$

== Multiclass networks ==
In the case of multiclass networks with R classes of customers, each queue k can feature different service rates μ_{k,r} for each job class r=1,...,R, although certain restrictions exist in the case of first-come first-served stations due to the assumptions of the BCMP theorem in the multiclass case.

The waiting time W_{k,r} experienced by class-r jobs at queue k can still be related to the total mean queue-length at node k using a generalization of the arrival theorem:

$$W_{k,r}(\mathbb{m}) = \frac{1+L_k\left(\mathbb{m}-1_r\right)}{\mu_{k,r}}.$$

where $\mathbb{m}=(m_1,\ldots,m_R)$ is a vector of customer population for the R classes and $1_r$ subtracts one from the r-th element of $\mathbb{m}$, assuming that $m_r\geq 1$.

For networks with a single customer class the MVA algorithm is very fast and time taken grows linearly with the number of customers and number of queues. However, in multiclass models the number of multiplications and additions and the storage requirements for MVA grow exponentially with the number of customer classes. Practically, the algorithm works well for 3-4 customer classes, although this generally depends on the implementation and the structure of the model. For example, the Tree-MVA method can scale to larger models if the routing matrix is sparse.

Exact values for mean performance metrics can be obtained in large models using the method of moments, which requires log-quadratic time. The method of moments can solve in practice models with up to 10 classes of customers or sometimes larger, which are typically inaccessible by means of exact MVA. This technique however does not use the arrival theorem and relies on solving systems of linear equations involving the normalizing constant of state probabilities for the queueing network.

Approximate MVA (AMVA) algorithms, such as the Bard-Schweitzer method, offer instead an alternative solution technique that provides low complexity also on multiclass networks and typically deliver highly accurate results.

== Extensions ==
The mean value analysis algorithm has been applied to a class of PEPA models describing queueing networks and the performance of a key distribution center.

== Software ==
- JMVA, a tool written in Java which implements MVA.
- queueing, a library for GNU Octave which includes MVA.
- Line, a MATLAB toolbox that includes exact and approximate MVA algorithms.

== See also ==
- Queueing theory
