= Retrial queue =

In queueing theory, a discipline within the mathematical theory of probability, a retrial queue is a model of a system with finite capacity, where jobs which arrive and find the system busy wait for some time before trying again to enter the system. Examples of such systems include making restaurant reservations and packet switching networks.
