= Walk-in Selection =

The Walk-in-Selection / Balloting Exercise of the Housing and Development Board in Singapore was a scheme that enabled eligible flat buyers to book their apartment. It was replaced by Sale of Balance Flats (SOBF).

In April 2002, the HDB offered 3-room & bigger flats in non-mature & some mature estates for sale on a town basis through a WIS process. The units were offered for sale to the general public progressively in batches to clear the backlog of 30,000 HDB units.

Buyers could walk in, apply, select and book their flat on-the-spot. HDB usually announced the details of the flats offered under the WIS for that month and the towns where they are located. The bookings were then held on the next working day on a first-come-first-served basis. As most of the units were completed, flat buyers could collect their keys within four months.
