= Buzen =

Buzen may refer to:

- Buzen, Fukuoka, a city located in Fukuoka, Japan
- Buzen Province, an old province of Japan in northern Kyushu
- Jeffrey P. Buzen, a computer scientist and businessman
