= Reversed compound agent theorem =

Aspect of probability theory

In probability theory, the reversed compound agent theorem (RCAT) is a set of sufficient conditions for a stochastic process expressed in any formalism to have a product form stationary distribution (assuming that the process is stationary). The theorem shows that product form solutions in Jackson's theorem, the BCMP theorem and G-networks are based on the same fundamental mechanisms.

The theorem identifies a reversed process using Kelly's lemma, from which the stationary distribution can be computed.
