= BCMP =

BCMP may stand for

- A BCMP network of queues, studied by Baskett, Chandy, Muntz, Palacios
- The British Columbia Marijuana Party
