= James R. Jackson =

American mathematician (1924–2011)

- Born: May 16, 1924; Denver, Colorado
- Died: March 20, 2011 (aged 86); Tehachapi, California
- Education: UCLA
- Known for: Jackson's theorem
- Scientific career
- Fields: Queueing theory
- Workplaces: UCLA
- Thesis: Abstract Function Spaces and Their Homotopy Theory (1952)
- Doctoral advisor: William Thomas Puckett, Jr.

James Richard "Jim" Jackson (May 16, 1924 – March 20, 2011) was an American mathematician, well known for his contribution to queueing theory.

Jackson was born in Denver and raised in Beverly Hills. He served in the United States Air Force during World War II. After his service, he earned an A.B. in 1946, an M.A. in 1950 and a Ph.D. in 1952, with a thesis titled Abstract Function Spaces and Their Homotopy Theory. All of these degrees were from UCLA where Jackson remained in the School of Management for his career until his retirement in 1985.

While at University of California, Los Angeles he developed the Jackson's theorem and some of the first models that could predict the performance of networks with several nodes. Jackson's work was inspired by his experience in the Los Angeles aircraft industry, but the results found applications in the design of computers, manufacturing and the then emerging packet switched networks, such as those undertaken by Leonard Kleinrock in 1961.

He spent his retirement in Tehachapi, California.

== Publications ==
- Jackson, James R. (1957). "Networks of waiting lines". Operations Research. 4 (4): 518–521. doi:10.1287/opre.5.4.518. JSTOR 167249.
- Jackson, James R. (Oct 1963). "Jobshop-like Queueing Systems". Management Science. 10 (1): 131–142. doi:10.1287/mnsc.1040.0268. JSTOR 2627213.
