= John McQuillan =

John McQuillan may refer to:

- John McQuillan (footballer), Scottish footballer
- John M. McQuillan (born 1949), American computer scientist
- Jack McQuillan, Irish politician
