= Lindley equation =

In probability theory, the Lindley equation, Lindley recursion or Lindley process is a discrete-time stochastic process A_{n} where n takes integer values and:

A_{n + 1} = max(0, A_{n} + B_{n}).

Processes of this form can be used to describe the waiting time of customers in a queue or evolution of a queue length over time. The idea was first proposed in the discussion following Kendall's 1951 paper.

== Waiting times ==
In Dennis Lindley's first paper on the subject the equation is used to describe waiting times experienced by customers in a queue with the First-In First-Out (FIFO) discipline.

W_{n + 1} = max(0,W_{n} + U_{n})

where

- T_{n} is the time between the nth and (n+1)th arrivals,
- S_{n} is the service time of the nth customer, and
- U_{n} = S_{n} − T_{n}
- W_{n} is the waiting time of the nth customer.

The first customer does not need to wait so W_{1} = 0. Subsequent customers will have to wait if they arrive at a time before the previous customer has been served.

== Queue lengths ==
The evolution of the queue length process can also be written in the form of a Lindley equation.

== Integral equation ==
Lindley's integral equation is a relationship satisfied by the stationary waiting time distribution F(x) in a G/G/1 queue.

$$F(x) = \int_{0^-}^\infty K(x-y)F(\text{d}y) \quad x \geq 0$$

Where K(x) is the distribution function of the random variable denoting the difference between the (k - 1)th customer's arrival and the inter-arrival time between (k - 1)th and kth customers. The Wiener–Hopf method can be used to solve this expression.
