= G/G/1 queue =

Probability theory concept

In queueing theory, a discipline within the mathematical theory of probability, the G/G/1 queue represents the queue length in a system with a single server where interarrival times have a general (meaning arbitrary) distribution and service times have a (different) general distribution. The evolution of the queue can be described by the Lindley equation.

The system is described in Kendall's notation where the G denotes a general distribution for both interarrival times and service times and the 1 that the model has a single server. Different interarrival and service times are considered to be independent, and sometimes the model is denoted GI/GI/1 to emphasise this. The numerical solution for the GI/G/1 can be obtained by discretizing the time.

== Waiting time ==
Kingman's formula gives an approximation for the mean waiting time in a G/G/1 queue. Lindley's integral equation is a relationship satisfied by the stationary waiting time distribution which can be solved using the Wiener–Hopf method.

== Multiple servers ==
Few results are known for the general G/G/k model as it generalises the M/G/k queue for which few metrics are known. Bounds can be computed using mean value analysis techniques, adapting results from the M/M/c queue model, using heavy traffic approximations, empirical results or approximating distributions by phase type distributions and then using matrix analytic methods to solve the approximate systems.

In a G/G/2 queue with heavy-tailed job sizes, the tail of the delay time distribution is known to behave like the tail of an exponential distribution squared under low loads and like the tail of an exponential distribution for high loads.
