= Forest Baskett =

American computer scientist

- Born: May 11, 1943 (age 83)
- Education: Rice University (BA); University of Texas at Austin (PhD)
- Occupation: Venture capitalist at New Enterprise Associates
- Known for: Cray-1; Very Large Scale Integration; BCMP network
- Scientific career
- Fields: Computer Science
- Workplaces: Stanford University

Forest Baskett (born May 11, 1943) is an American venture capitalist, computer scientist and former professor of electrical engineering at Stanford University.

He is a venture capitalist at New Enterprise Associates. Baskett designed the operating system for the original Cray-1 supercomputer, was an original pioneer of Very Large Scale Integration, and co-introduced the eponymous BCMP networks.

== Career ==
Baskett received a BA in mathematics from Rice University and a Ph.D. in computer science from the University of Texas at Austin.

He became a member of the National Academy of Engineering in 1994 for his vision and leadership in the development of hardware and software for high-performance workstations.

Baskett was the doctoral advisor of computer scientists Alan J. Smith and Andy Bechtolsheim while at Stanford and was involved in the founding of Sun Microsystems. He was also the CTO and Senior Vice President of R&D at Silicon Graphics (SGI).
