= Gordon–Newell theorem =

In queueing theory, a discipline within the mathematical theory of probability, the Gordon–Newell theorem is an extension of Jackson's theorem from open queueing networks to closed queueing networks of exponential servers where customers cannot leave the network. Jackson's theorem cannot be applied to closed networks because the queue length at a node in the closed network is limited by the population of the network. The Gordon–Newell theorem calculates the open network solution and then eliminates the infeasible states by renormalizing the probabilities. Calculation of the normalizing constant makes the treatment more awkward as the whole state space must be enumerated. Buzen's algorithm or mean value analysis can be used to calculate the normalizing constant more efficiently.

== Definition of a Gordon–Newell network ==
A network of m interconnected queues is known as a Gordon–Newell network or closed Jackson network if it meets the following conditions:

1. the network is closed (no customers can enter or leave the network),
2. all service times are exponentially distributed and the service discipline at all queues is FCFS,
3. a customer completing service at queue i will move to queue j with probability $P_{ij}$, with the $P_{ij}$ such that $\sum_{j =1}^m P_{ij} = 1$,
4. the utilization of all of the queues is less than one.

== Theorem ==
In a closed Gordon–Newell network of m queues, with a total population of K individuals, write $\scriptstyle{(k_1,k_2,\ldots,k_m)}$ (where k_{i} is the length of queue i) for the state of the network and S(K, m) for the state space

$$S(K,m) = \left\{ \mathbf{k} \in \mathbb{N}^m \text{ such that } \sum_{i=1}^m k_i = K \right\}.$$

Then the equilibrium state probability distribution exists and is given by

$$\pi (k_1,k_2,\ldots,k_m) = \frac{1}{G(K)} \prod_{i=1}^m \left( \frac{e_i}{\mu_i} \right)^{k_i}$$

where service times at queue i are exponentially distributed with parameter μ_{i}. The normalizing constant G(K) is given by

$$G(K) = \sum_{\mathbf{k} \in S(K,m)} \prod_{i=1}^{m} \left( \frac{e_i}{\mu_i} \right)^{k_i} ,$$

and e_{i} is the visit ratio, calculated by solving the simultaneous equations

$$e_i = \sum_{j=1}^m e_j p_{ji} \text{ for }1 \leq i \leq m.$$

== See also ==
- BCMP network
