= Jeffrey P. Buzen =

American computer scientist

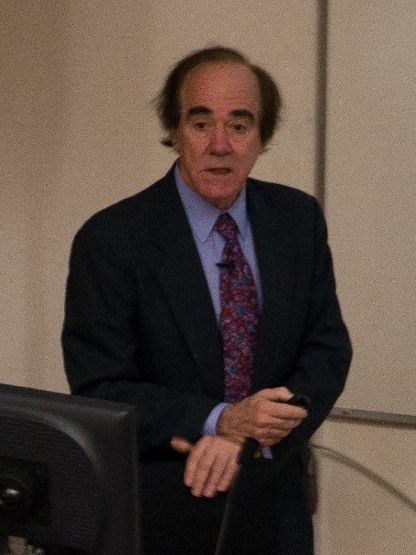
- Born: May 28, 1943 (age 83); Brooklyn
- Education: Brown University (BS); Harvard University (MS, PhD)
- Known for: Buzen's algorithm BGS Systems
- Scientific career
- Fields: queueing theory
- Workplaces: NIH
- Thesis: Queueing network models of multiprogramming (1971)
- Doctoral advisor: Ugo O. Gagliardi
- Doctoral students: Robert Metcalfe

Jeffrey Peter Buzen (born May 28, 1943) is an American computer scientist in system performance analysis best known for his contributions to queueing theory. His PhD dissertation and his 1973 paper Computational algorithms for closed queueing networks with exponential servers have guided the study of queueing network modeling for decades.

Born in Brooklyn, Buzen holds three degrees in Applied Mathematics -- an ScB (1965) from Brown University and, from Harvard University, an MS (1966) and a PhD (1971). He was a systems programmer at the National Institutes of Health in Bethesda, Maryland (1967–69), where his technique for optimizing the performance of a realtime biomedical computer system led to his first publication at a 1969 IEEE conference. After completing his PhD, he held concurrent appointments as a lecturer in computer science at Harvard and as a systems engineer at Honeywell (1971-76). Some of his students at Harvard have gone on to become well-known figures in computing. Buzen was PhD thesis advisor for Robert M. Metcalfe (1973), Turing Award winner and co-inventor of Ethernet, and for John M. McQuillan (1974), developer the original adaptive routing algorithms used in ARPAnet and Internet. Buzen also co-taught a two-semester graduate-level course on operating systems (AM 251a/AM251br) that Microsoft co-founder Bill Gates took during his freshman year (1973-74). Gates wrote "It was the only 'computer course' I officially took at Harvard."

In addition to being an educator and a researcher, Buzen is also an entrepreneur. Along with fellow Harvard applied mathematics PhDs Robert Goldberg and Harold Schwenk, he co-founded BGS Systems in 1975. The company, which began operations in his basement, developed, marketed and supported software products for the performance management and capacity planning of enterprise computer systems. Their flagship modeling product, BEST/1, was based on proprietary extensions to the queuing network models and computational algorithms that Buzen developed in his PhD thesis.

BGS Systems was listed on NASDAQ (BGSS) from 1983 to 1998. Buzen served as chief scientist and senior vice president until the company was acquired by BMC Software in 1998.

In addition to the development of specific models and algorithms, Buzen's research has also dealt extensively with the question of why some stochastic models work surprisingly well in practice, even though the theoretical assumptions upon which these models are based seem unlikely to be satisfied by real world systems. This has led the development of an alternative approach to stochastic modeling that makes it possible to derive certain classical results using simpler assumptions that are more likely to be satisfied in practice. His initial 1976 paper on this topic Fundamental Laws of Computer System Performance received the inaugural ACM Sigmetrics “Test of Time Award” in 2010, reflecting 34 years of enduring influence. His 2016 book Rethinking Randomness extends this work further and presents a generalized modeling framework he refers to as observational stochastics.

Buzen has held leadership positions in various professional societies, including Association for Computing Machinery Sigmetrics, the International Federation for Information Processing Working Group 7.3, and the Computer Measurement Group (serving as president during 2000–2001). In 1979, he received Computer Measurement Group's A.A. Michelson award for technical excellence and professional contributions as a teacher and inspirer of others. He also received the ACM SIGMETRICS Achievement Award in 2010.

He was elected a member of the National Academy of Engineering in 2003 for contributions to the theory and commercial application of computer system performance models.

== See also ==
- Buzen's algorithm
