= Catherine Rosenberg =

Electrical engineer

Catherine P. Rosenberg is an electrical engineer whose research interests include resource management in wireless sensor networks, quality of service in network traffic engineering, and smart grids in energy systems. Educated in France and the US, she has worked in France, the US, the UK, and Canada, where she is a professor in the department of Electrical and Computer Engineering and Cisco Research Chair in 5G Systems at the University of Waterloo.

== Education and career ==
Rosenberg earned a diploma in telecommunications engineering at the École nationale supérieure des télécommunications de Bretagne in 1983, and a master's degree in computer science at the University of California, Los Angeles in 1984. She completed her Ph.D. in 1986 through Paris-Sud University, under the direction of Erol Gelenbe.

After working at Alcatel and Bell Labs, Rosenberg took her first faculty position from 1988 to 1996, in electrical and computer engineering at Polytechnique Montréal. After working in the UK for Nortel from 1996 to 1999, she became a professor of electrical and computer engineering at Purdue University in the US from 1999 to 2004. In 2004 she took her present position as a professor at the University of Waterloo, also serving as chair of the Department of Electrical and Computer Engineering. She was named as a tier 1 Canada Research Chair in the Future Internet in 2010 (renewed in 2017), and Cisco Research Chair in 5G Systems in 2018.

== Recognition ==
Rosenberg was elected as an IEEE Fellow in 2011, "for contributions to resource management in wireless and satellite networks". She was elected to the Canadian Academy of Engineering in 2013.
