= John M. McQuillan =

American computer scientist (born 1949)

John M. McQuillan (born 23 February 1949 in New York City) is an American computer scientist who did studies of adaptive routing in the early ARPANET and the subsequent Internet.

After receiving his A.B. in 1970 and a M.S. in 1971, he completed a Ph.D. in 1974 in applied mathematics from Harvard University. He was since 1971 employed at the computer networking equipment manufacturer Bolt, Beranek and Newman in Cambridge, MA, where he programmed the Interface Message Processor, work that in part led to his dissertation Adaptive routing for distributed computer networks advised by Jeffrey P. Buzen in 1974. In his dissertation, McQuillan developed ways to reroute messages around faulty and congested areas in the Internet based on delay feedback. These mechanisms were used in the first link-state routing protocols from 1978.

In addition to publishing scientific journal articles, mainly in the IEEE journals, he also edited the two early introductions to networking, Understanding the new local network technologies (BBN, 1978) and A practical view of computer communications protocols (IEEE, 1978).

He started McQuillan Consulting in Concord, MA (1982), became a columnist to Business Communications Review as well as an annual organizer of the Next Generation Network (NGN) conferences. He became partner in International Venture Partner (1996).Today, he is the director of McQuillan Ventures, that invests in network infrastructure companies.

His father, John McQuillan (died 1984), was a communications engineer and a participant in the first trans-Atlantic radio conversation.
