= Erol Gelenbe =

Turkish-French computer scientist (born 1945)

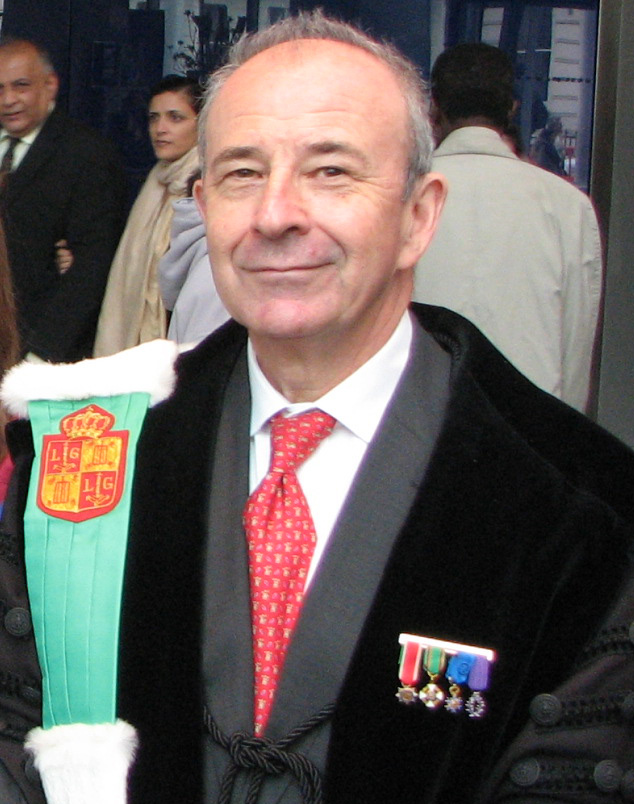
- Born: 22 August 1945 (age 81); Istanbul
- Education: TED Ankara College; Middle East Technical University (B.Sc.); New York University Tandon School of Engineering (M.Sc., Ph.D.); Sorbonne University (Ph.D.)
- Known for: G-networks; Random neural network
- Awards: Chevalier de la Legion d'Honneur; Commander of the Ordre national du Mérite; Commander of the Order of Merit of the Italian Republic; Grand Officer of the Order of the Star of Italy; Commander of the Order of the Crown of Belgium; Officer's Cross of the Order of Merit of Poland; METU Parlar Science Award; Mustafa Prize; IEEE Fellow; ACM Fellow
- Scientific career
- Fields: Computer science Electrical engineering Applied mathematics
- Workplaces: University of Liège; Paris-Sud 11 University; New Jersey Institute of Technology; Duke University; University of Central Florida; Imperial College; Institute of Theoretical and Applied Informatics, Polish Academy of Sciences
- Thesis: Stochastic automata with structural restrictions (1970)
- Doctoral advisor: Edward J. Smith; Jacques-Louis Lions
- Doctoral students: Jacques Lenfant; Andrzej Duda; François Baccelli; Brigitte Plateau; Guy Pujolle; Catherine Rosenberg
- Website: www.ee.ic.ac.uk/gelenbe/ www.iitis.pl/en/person/segelenbe

Sami Erol Gelenbe (born 22 August 1945, Istanbul) is a Turkish and French computer scientist, electronic engineer and applied mathematician, known for inventing the Random neural network and his pioneering work in computer system and network performance. His academic career spans several prestigious institutions and roles, including currently as Professor at the Institute of Theoretical and Applied Informatics of the Polish Academy of Sciences since 2017, and visitor positions at King's College London and the I3S Laboratory (CNRS, University of Côte d'Azur.

A Fellow of several national academies and Foreign Fellow of the Indian National Science Academy, Gelenbe chairs the Informatics Section of Academia Europaea since 2023. Previous professorial tenures include the University of Liège (1974–79), University Paris-Saclay (1979–1986), University Paris Descartes (1986–1993), NJIT (1991–93), Duke University (1993–1998), the University of Central Florida (1998–2003), and Imperial College (2003–2020), where he served as the Dennis Gabor Professor and Head of Intelligent Systems and Networks.

== Biography ==
Erol Gelenbe is the son of Maria Sacchet Gelenbe and Yusuf Âli Gelenbe, a descendant of the 18th-century Ottoman mathematician Gelenbevi Ismail Efendi and nephew of the Ottoman Sheyhulislam Mehmet Cemaleddin Efendi. Erol graduated from TED Ankara Koleji and the Middle East Technical University, Ankara, where he won the K.K. Clarke Research Award for his undergraduate thesis on "partial flux switching magnetic memory systems". Awarded a Fulbright Fellowship, he completed a master's degree and Ph.D. at the Polytechnic University on "Stochastic automata with structural restrictions" under Prof. Edward J. Smith.

== Career ==
Immediately after his PhD from the Polytechnic Institute of Brooklyn (now the New York University Tandon School of Engineering), he joined the University of Michigan in 1970 as an assistant professor. He was granted a leave of absence from the University of Michigan in 1972, and joined INRIA, France, where he founded the Modeling and Performance Evaluation of Computer Systems research group, and was also a visiting associate professor at Paris 13 University. He was elected to a Chair (full professorship) in Computer Science at the University of Liège (Belgium) and appointed in 1973, joining Professor Danny Ribbens with whom he remained a life-long friend. He also continued as a research director (Directeur Scientifique) at INRIA and was awarded a Doctorat d'État ès Sciences Mathématiques (November 1973) from Sorbonne University, with a thesis on "Modèlisation des systèmes informatiques", under Professor Jacques-Louis Lions. He moved to the Paris-Sud 11 University in 1979, co-founded the Laboratoire de Recherche en Informatique and its Ph.D. Program, before joining Paris Descartes University in 1986 as founding director of the Ecole des Hautes Etudes en Informatique.

Gelenbe was appointed New Jersey State Endowed Chair Professor at the New Jersey Institute of Technology (1991–1993). He joined Duke University in 1993 and was appointed Nello L. Teer Chair Professor and Chair of Electrical and Computer Engineering. In 1998 he moved to the University of Central Florida to create the School of Electrical Engineering and Computer Science and the Harris Corporation Engineering Centre. In 2003 he was offered the Dennis Gabor Chair at Imperial College London as Head of Intelligent Systems and Networks. After Brexit, he became Professor at IITIS-PAN of the Polish Academy of Sciences in 2017, and is a Foreign Fellow of the Polish Science Academy since 2013. He retired from Imperial College in 2019 to continue as Professor at the Institute of Theoretical and Applied Informatics of the Polish Academy of Sciences, Coordinator or Principal Investigator of EU H2020 Research and Innovation Project SerIoT (2017–2021) on the security of the Internet of Things, the EU H2020 Research and Innovation Programmes SDK4ED (2018–2020) and IoTAC (2020–2023), the EU Horizon Project DOSS (2023–2026) and the Marie-Curie Project SAILING (2026-2029). He served as SAPEA Advisor on Cybersecurity for the EU High Level Group (2017), Member of the Fake-News Study Group of the All-European Academies (ALLEA, 2020–2021), leader of the Science Communication (Diffusion des Sciences) Study Group (2020–21) of the Belgian Royal Academy of Sciences, Arts and Letters, and Study Group leader on "From Research to Innovation in Europe" (2022) of the Association of European Academies of Applied Sciences and Engineering.

== Research ==
=== Performance evaluation and queueing theory ===
Gelenbe's early research focused on the mathematical analysis of computer systems, communication networks, and distributed computing. Beginning in the late 1960s, he developed stochastic models for operating systems, memory management, virtual memory, checkpointing, software reliability, and packet-switching networks. His work contributed to the development of computer system performance evaluation by introducing analytical models for resource allocation, fault tolerance, response time, and system availability.

During the 1970s and 1980s, he expanded this research to queueing theory and stochastic networks, publishing work on diffusion approximations, distributed databases, synchronization, parallel processing, manufacturing systems, and communication protocols. His research established mathematical methods for analyzing complex computer and communication systems under uncertainty.

=== Random Neural Networks and G-networks ===
In 1989, Gelenbe introduced the Random Neural Network (RNN), a probabilistic neural network model in which neurons exchange excitatory and inhibitory signals while admitting an exact product-form equilibrium solution. The model combines concepts from queueing theory, probability, and neural computation and has been applied to machine learning, pattern recognition, image processing, computer vision, optimization, signal processing, robotics, medical diagnosis, and wireless communications.

He also developed G-networks, a class of queueing networks that extends classical queueing theory by incorporating positive and negative customers, triggers, resets, and other signalling mechanisms. G-networks provide analytical solutions for systems involving interacting processes and have been applied to communication networks, cloud computing, manufacturing, biological systems, and energy management.

=== Computer networks and adaptive systems ===
From the 1990s onward, Gelenbe's research increasingly focused on communication networks and distributed systems. He developed the Cognitive Packet Network (CPN), an adaptive routing architecture that uses reinforcement learning to select network paths according to quality-of-service objectives such as delay, reliability, security, and energy consumption. His subsequent work examined self-aware and autonomic networks capable of adapting to changing network conditions without centralized control.

His research has also addressed quality-of-service management, bandwidth allocation, congestion control, wireless sensor networks, cloud computing, Internet of Things (IoT) systems, and software-defined networking, with particular emphasis on balancing performance, reliability, and energy efficiency.

=== Energy-aware computing, cybersecurity and interdisciplinary applications ===
In later years, Gelenbe's research expanded to energy-efficient computing and cyber-physical systems. He introduced Energy Packet Networks, a stochastic modelling framework for analysing energy flow in computing systems, with applications to energy harvesting, cloud computing, and sustainable network design.

His work has also examined cybersecurity, including adaptive defence mechanisms, denial-of-service attacks, malware propagation, software reliability, and resilient communication networks. Beyond computer networking, he has published research in computational biology, gene regulatory networks, emergency evacuation modelling, autonomous search, disaster response, and intelligent transportation systems

== Awards and honours ==
=== Honours ===
- Cross of Officer of the Order of Merit of the Republic of Poland (Polish: Krzyż Oficerski Orderu Zasługi Rzeczpospolitej Polskiej), awarded by decree of the President of Poland dated 12 January 2024, and conferred on 10 June 2024.
- Commander of the Order of the Crown (Belgium), by Royal Decree of 28 October 2022
- Commander of the Ordre National du Mérite, France, 2019 (awarded Knighthood in 1993)
- Knight of the Légion d'Honneur (France), 2014, France's most senior civilian or military honor that dates from the Napoleonic period.
- Knight Commander in the Order of the Star of Italy, or "Grande Ufficiale dell'Ordine della Stella d'Italia", 2007, an honor awarded for eminent services to culture, including science.
- Commander of the Order of Merit of the Republic of Italy (or Commendatore dell'Ordine al Merito della Repubblica Italiana), 2005, Italy's most senior honour.
- Knight of the Ordre des Palmes Académiques, 2003, France's oldest civilian honor dating to the Napoleonic period, awarded to those who have made distinguished contributions to education.

=== National Academy Fellowships ===
- Fellow of the International Core Academy of Sciences and Humanities, 2026
- Foreign Fellow of the Indian National Science Academy, 2025
- Honorary Fellow of the Islamic World Academy of Sciences, 2022
- Foreign Fellow of the Académie Royale de Belgique, 2015.
- Foreign Fellow of the Polish Academy of Sciences, 2013.
- Full Member of the Science Academy Society of Turkey, 2012
- Honorary Fellow of the Hungarian Academy of Sciences, 2010
- Fellow of the National Academy of Technologies of France or Académie des technologies, 2008
- Member of Academia Europaea, 2005

=== Elected Fellowships in Professional Societies ===
- Fellow of the Institution of Electrical Engineers (IEE, London), 1985, later the Institution of Engineering and Technology (IET)
- Fellow of the Institute of Electrical and Electronics Engineers (IEEE), New York City, 1986
- Fellow of the Association for Computing Machinery (ACM), New York City, 2002
- Fellow of the Royal Statistical Society (FRSS), 2020
- Fellow IFIP Fellow, 2019, elected among the First 18 Fellows of IFIP on the 60th IFIP's 60th Anniversary
- Fellow of the International Academy of Artificial Intelligence Sciences (formerly named the Asia Pacific Artificial Intelligence Association), 2022
- Fellow (Academician) of the International Artificial Intelligence Industry Alliance (AIIA), 2023

=== Honorary Doctorates (Honoris Causa) ===
- Doctor Honoris Causa, the Hungarian Academy of Sciences, 2010
- Doctor Honoris Causa, University of Liège, 2006, Belgium
- Doctor Honoris Causa, Boğaziçi University, Istanbul, 2004
- Doctor Honoris Causa, University of Rome Tor Vergata "in Ars Computandi", Italy, 1996

=== Awards ===
- IEEE TCSC Award for Excellence 2025 (IEEE Technical Committee on Scalable Computing): Given to a single individual annually for significant and sustained contributions to scalable computing and outstanding leadership within the TCSC community)
- Mustafa Prize, 2017
- In Memoriam Dennis Gabor Award, NOVOFER Foundation, Budapest, 2013
- Institution of Engineering and Technology Oliver Lodge Medal, London, 2010
- Imperial College, Rector's Research Award, 2008
- ACM SIGMETRICS Life-Time Achievement Award, describes him "as the single individual who, over a span of 30 years, has made the greatest overall contribution to the field of Computer System and Network Performance Evaluation", 2008
- France Telecom Prize, one of the Grands Prix of the French Academy of Sciences, 1996
- METU Parlar Foundation Science Award, Ankara, 1994
- International Federation for Information Processing (IFIP) Silver Core Award, 1980

== Selected bibliography ==
- E. Gelenbe "On languages defined by linear probabilistic automata", Information and Control, 16(5):487–501, July 1970.
- E. Gelenbe "A realizable model for stochastic sequential machines", IEEE Trans. Comput. C-20, pp. 199–204, 1971.
- E. Gelenbe "On approximate computer system models", Journal of the ACM 22 (2): 261–269 (April 1975).
- Fayolle, Guy; Gelenbe, Erol; Labetoulle, Jacques (July 1977). "Stability and Optimal Control of the Packet Switching Broadcast Channel". Journal of the ACM. 24 (3): 375–386. doi:10.1145/322017.322019.
- E. Gelenbe and I. Mitrani "Analysis and synthesis of computer systems", Academic Press (June 1980), 239 pp., ISBN 0-12-279350-1, ISBN 978-0-12-279350-9.
- E. Gelenbe "On the optimum checkpoint interval", Journal of the ACM, 26(2):259–270, April 1979.
- Gelenbe; Sevcik (October 1979). "Analysis of Update Synchronization for Multiple Copy Data Bases". IEEE Transactions on Computers. C-28 (10): 737–747. Bibcode:1979ITCmp.100..737G. doi:10.1109/TC.1979.1675241.
- Gelenbe, Erol (December 1989). "Random Neural Networks with Negative and Positive Signals and Product Form Solution". Neural Computation. 1 (4): 502–510. Bibcode:1989NeCom...1..502G. doi:10.1162/neco.1989.1.4.502.
- Gelenbe, Erol (January 1993). "Learning in the Recurrent Random Neural Network". Neural Computation. 5 (1): 154–164. doi:10.1162/neco.1993.5.1.154.
- E. Gelenbe "Product-Form queueing networks with negative and positive customers", Journal of Applied Probability, Vol. 28 (3): 656–663 (Sep. 1991).
- E. Gelenbe, Mao, Z.H., Li, Y.D. "Function approximation with spiked random networks", IEEE Trans. on Neural Networks, 10 (1): 3–9, 1999.
- E. Gelenbe and G. Pujolle "Introduction to Queueing Networks", John Wiley & Sons, Inc. New York City, 1987 and 2000.
- E. Gelenbe, R. Lent and Z. Xu "Design and performance of a cognitive packet network", Performance Evaluation, 46, (2–3): 155–176, October 2001.
- E. Gelenbe and Hussain K.F. "Learning in the multiple class random neural network", IEEE Transactions on Neural Networks, 13(6): 1257–1267, 2002.
- E. Gelenbe, Gellman, R. M. Lent, P. Liu and Pu Su "Autonomous smart routing for network QoS", Proc. International Conference on Autonomic Computing: 232–239, ISBN 0-7695-2114-2, 17–18 May 2004.
- Fourneau, Jean-Michel; Gelenbe, Erol (July 2004). "Flow equivalence and stochastic equivalence in G-networks". Computational Management Science. 1 (2). doi:10.1007/s10287-003-0008-z.
- E. Gelenbe "Steady-state solution of probabilistic gene regulatory networks", Physical Review E, 76(1), 031903 (2007).
- E. Gelenbe "A Diffusion Model for Packet Travel Time in a Random Multi-Hop Medium", ACM Trans. on Sensor Networks, 3 (2), Article 10, June 2007.
- E. Gelenbe "Dealing with software viruses: a biological paradigm", Information Security Technical Reports 12: 242–250, Elsevier Science, 2007.
- E. Gelenbe, G. Sakellari and M. d'Arienzo "Admission of QoS aware users in a smart network", ACM Trans. on Autonomous and Adaptive Systems, 3(1), TAAS-07-0003, 2008.
- E. Gelenbe "Network of interacting synthetic molecules in equilibrium" Proc. Royal Society A 464:2219–2228, 2008.
- E. Gelenbe and I. Mitrani "Analysis and Synthesis of Computer Systems" World Scientific, Imperial College Press, Singapore and London, 2009.
- E. Gelenbe "Analysis of single and networked auctions", ACM Trans. on Internet Technology, 9 (2), 2009.
- E. Gelenbe "Steps toward self-aware networks", Communications ACM, 52 (7):66–75, July 2009.
- A. Berl, E. Gelenbe, M. Di Girolamo, G. Giuliani, H. De Meer, M. Quan Dang, and K. Pentikousis "Energy-efficient cloud computing", Comp. J. 53 (7): 1045–1051, 2010.
- E. Gelenbe "Search in unknown random environments", Phys. Rev. E 82: 061112, 2010.
- Gelenbe, E.; Morfopoulou, C. (June 2011). "A Framework for Energy-Aware Routing in Packet Networks". The Computer Journal. 54 (6): 850–859. doi:10.1093/comjnl/bxq092.
- O. H. Abdelrahman and E. Gelenbe. "Time and energy in team-based search", Phys. Rev. E, 87(3):032125, March 2013.
- Gelenbe, E.; Yin, Yonghua (2017). Deep Learning with Dense Random Neural Networks. Man-Machine Interactions 5. ICMMI 2017. Advances in Intelligent Systems and Computing. Vol. 659. Springer, Cham. pp. 3–18. doi:10.1007/978-3-319-67792-7_1. ISBN 978-3-319-67792-7.
- Grenet, Ingrid; Yin, Yonghua; Comet, Jean-Paul; Gelenbe, Erol (2018). Machine Learning to Predict Toxicity of Compounds (PDF). Artificial Neural Networks and Machine Learning – ICANN 2018. Lecture Notes in Computer Science (LNTCS). Vol. 11139. Springer, Cham. pp. 335–345. doi:10.1007/978-3-030-01418-6_33.
- Y. M. Kadioglu and E. Gelenbe. "Product-form solution for cascade networks with intermittent energy," IEEE Systems Journal 13 (1): 918–927 (2018)
- E. Gelenbe, P Campegiani, T Czachórski, SK Katsikas, I Komnios, et al. "Security in Computer and Information Sciences: First International ISCIS Security Workshop 2018, Euro-CYBERSEC 2018, London, UK, February 26–27, 2018, Revised Selected Papers", Lecture Notes, Vol. CCIS 821, Springer, Berlin (2018)
- Gelenbe, Erol; Abdelrahman, Omer H. (2018). "An Energy Packet Network model for mobile networks with energy harvesting". Nonlinear Theory and Its Applications, IEICE. 9 (3): 322–336. Bibcode:2018NTA.....9..322G. doi:10.1587/nolta.9.322.
- E. Gelenbe and Y. M. Kadioglu. "Energy life-time of wireless nodes with network attacks and mitigation," 2018 ICC: IEEE International Conf. on Comms. Workshops (ICC), IEEEXpress, (2018)
- W. Serrano and E. Gelenbe. "The Random Neural Network in a neurocomputing application for Web search," Neurocomputing 280: 123–132 (2018)
- M. G. Siavvas and E. Gelenbe. "Optimum checkpoints for programs with loops," Simul. Model. Pract. Theory 97: 101951 (2019)
- Y. M. Kadioglu and Gelenbe. "Product-Form Solution for Cascade Networks With Intermittent Energy," IEEE Systems Journal 13(1): 918-927 (2019)
- E. Gelenbe and Y. Zhang. "Performance Optimization With Energy Packets," IEEE Systems Journal 13(4): 3770-3780 (2019)
- J. Du, E. Gelenbe, C. Jiang, H. Zhang, Y. Ren and H. V. Poor. "Peer Prediction-Based Trustworthiness Evaluation and Trustworthy Service Rating in Social Networks," IEEE Trans. Information Forensics and Security 14(6): 1582-1594 (2019)
- Gelenbe, Erol; Domanska, Joanna; Frohlich, Piotr; Nowak, Mateusz P.; Nowak, Slawomir (July 2020). "Self-Aware Networks That Optimize Security, QoS, and Energy". Proceedings of the IEEE. 108 (7): 1150–1167. Bibcode:2020IEEEP.108.1150G. doi:10.1109/JPROC.2020.2992559.
- Gelenbe, Erol (January 2020). "Introduction to the Special Issue on the French–Polish Collaboration in Mathematical Models of Computer Systems, Networks and Bioinformatics". SN Computer Science. 1 (1) 44. doi:10.1007/s42979-019-0044-6.
- Frohlich, Piotr; Gelenbe, Erol; Nowak, Mateusz P. (2020). "Smart SDN Management of Fog Services". 2020 Global Internet of Things Summit (GIoTS). pp. 1–6. doi:10.1109/GIOTS49054.2020.9119542. ISBN 978-1-7281-6728-2.
- W. Serrano, E. Gelenbe and Y. Yin. "The Random Neural Network with Deep Learning Clusters in Smart Search," Neurocomputing 396: 394-405 (2020)
- Gelenbe, Erol; Siavvas, Miltiadis (27 January 2021). "Minimizing Energy and Computation in Long-Running Software". Applied Sciences. 11 (3): 1169. doi:10.3390/app11031169.
- Kehagias, Dionysios; Jankovic, Marija; Siavvas, Miltiadis; Gelenbe, Erol (February 2021). "Investigating the Interaction between Energy Consumption, Quality of Service, Reliability, Security, and Maintainability of Computer Systems and Networks". SN Computer Science. 2 (1): 23. doi:10.1007/s42979-020-00404-8. PMC 7790931. PMID 33437964.
- Filus, Katarzyna; Boryszko, Paweł; Domańska, Joanna; Siavvas, Miltiadis; Gelenbe, Erol (6 February 2021). "Efficient Feature Selection for Static Analysis Vulnerability Prediction". Sensors. 21 (4): 1133. Bibcode:2021Senso..21.1133F. doi:10.3390/s21041133. PMC 7915846. PMID 33561957.
- Fröhlich, Piotr; Gelenbe, Erol; Fiołka, Jerzy; Chęciński, Jacek; Nowak, Mateusz; Filus, Zdzisław (29 April 2021). "Smart SDN Management of Fog Services to Optimize QoS and Energy". Sensors. 21 (9): 3105. Bibcode:2021Senso..21.3105F. doi:10.3390/s21093105. PMC 8124283. PMID 33946909.
- Gelenbe, Erol; Nakip, Mert (2022). "Traffic Based Sequential Learning During Botnet Attacks to Identify Compromised IoT Devices". IEEE Access. 10: 126536–126549. Bibcode:2022IEEEA..10l6536G. doi:10.1109/ACCESS.2022.3226700.
- Gelenbe, Erol (August 2023). "Electricity Consumption by ICT: Facts, trends, and measurements". Ubiquity. 2023 (August): 1–15. doi:10.1145/3613207.
- Gelenbe, Erol; Nakip, Mert (2023). "IoT Network Cybersecurity Assessment With the Associated Random Neural Network". IEEE Access. 11: 85501–85512. Bibcode:2023IEEEA..1185501G. doi:10.1109/ACCESS.2023.3297977.
- Kuaban, Godlove Suila; Gelenbe, Erol; Czachórski, Tadeusz; Czekalski, Piotr; Tangka, Julius Kewir (6 July 2023). "Modelling of the Energy Depletion Process and Battery Depletion Attacks for Battery-Powered Internet of Things (IoT) Devices". Sensors. 23 (13): 6183. Bibcode:2023Senso..23.6183K. doi:10.3390/s23136183. PMC 10346553. PMID 37448032.
- Ma, Yuting; Gelenbe, Erol; Liu, Kezhong (13 March 2024). "Impact of IoT System Imperfections and Passenger Errors on Cruise Ship Evacuation Delay". Sensors. 24 (6): 1850. Bibcode:2024Senso..24.1850M. doi:10.3390/s24061850. PMC 10974784. PMID 38544113.
- Kuaban, Godlove Suila; Gelenbe, Erol; Czachórski, Tadeusz; Czekalski, Piotr; Nkemeni, Valery (August 2024). "Energy performance of off-grid green cellular base stations". Performance Evaluation. 165 102426. doi:10.1016/j.peva.2024.102426.
- Gelenbe, Erol; Gül, Baran Can; Nakıp, Mert (December 2024). "DISFIDA: Distributed Self-Supervised Federated Intrusion Detection Algorithm with online learning for health Internet of Things and Internet of Vehicles". Internet of Things. 28 101340. doi:10.1016/j.iot.2024.101340.
- Y. Ma, E. Gelenbe, K. Liu "IoT Performance for Maritime Passenger Evacuation," 2024 IEEE 10th World Forum on the IoT, PP. 1–6, 2024
- J. Bergquist, E. Gelenbe, K. Sigman, "On an Adaptive-Quasi-Deterministic Transmission Policy Queueing Model," IEEE Computer Society, MASCOTS 2024, pp. 1–7, 024
- Gelenbe, Erol; Nakıp, Mert; Siavvas, Miltiadis (October 2024). "System-wide vulnerability of multi-component software". Computers & Industrial Engineering. 196 110453. doi:10.1016/j.cie.2024.110453.
- G. S. Kuaban, T. Czachórski, E. Gelenbe, P. Czekalski, "Energy performance of Internet of Things (IoT) networks for pipeline monitoring," The 20th International Wireless Communications and Mobile Computing, IEEEXplore, 2024
- M. Nakip, E. Gelenbe, "Online Self-Supervised Deep Learning for Intrusion Detection Systems," IEEE Transactions on Information Forensics and Security 19, pp. 5668–5683, 2024 www.iitis.pl/sites/default/files/pubs/2306.13030v2.pdf
- Gelenbe, Erol; Nakıp, Mert; Siavvas, Miltiadis (2024). "System Wide Vulnerability and Trust in Multi-Component Communication System Software". IEEE Network. 39 (2): 108–114. doi:10.1109/MNET.2024.3452962.
- Gelenbe, Erol; Nakıp, Mert; Siavvas, Miltiadis (October 2024). "System Wide Vulnerability and Trust in Multi-Component Software". Computers & Industrial Engineering. 196: 100453. doi:10.1016/j.cie.2024.110453.
- Gelenbe, Erol; Gul, Baran Can; Nakip, Mert (October 2024). "DISFIDA: Distributed Self-Supervised Federated Intrusion Detection Algorithm with Online Learning for Health Internet of Things and Internet of Vehicles". Internet of Things. 28 101340. doi:10.1016/j.iot.2024.101340.
- Gelenbe, Erol (January 2025). "Minimizing Delay and Power Consumption at the Edge". Sensors. 25 (2): 502. Bibcode:2025Senso..25..502G. doi:10.3390/s25020502. PMC 11768709. PMID 39860874.
- Gelenbe, Erol; Nasereddin, Mohammed (February 2025). "Adaptive Attack Mitigation for IoV Flood Attacks". IEEE Internet of Things Journal. 12 (5): 4701–4714. arXiv:2501.10224. Bibcode:2025IITJ...12.4701G. doi:10.1109/JIOT.2025.3529615.
- Bergquist, Jacob; Gelenbe, Erol; Nasereddin, Mohammed; Sigman, Karl (November 2025). "Mitigating massive access with Quasi-Deterministic Transmission: Experiments and stationary analysis". Performance Evaluation. 170 102512. doi:10.1016/j.peva.2025.102512.
- Gelenbe, Erol; Nasereddin, Mohammed (9–11 October 2025). Data Driven Optimum Cyberattack Mitigation. IEEE DSAA'25: Data Science and Advanced Analytics Conference, Birmingham, UK. doi:10.13140/RG.2.2.13142.36169.
- Tang, Y.; Liu, J.; Lan Yan, Z.; Gelenbe, Erol (2026). "Security of LLM-based Agents Regarding Attacks, Defenses, and Applications: A Comprehensive Surve". Information Fusion Part C. 117 103941. doi:10.1016/j.inffus.2025.103941.
- Gelenbe, Erol; Ma, Yuting (2026). "IoT-Driven Pull Scheduling to Avoid Congestion in Human Emergency Evacuation". Sensors. 26 (3): 837. Bibcode:2026Senso..26..837G. doi:10.3390/s26030837. PMC 12899495. PMID 41682357.
- Gelenbe, Erol; Ren, Q.; Yan, Z. (2026). "A trust model for networked systems". npj Wireless Technology. 2 (10) 10. Springer Nature. doi:10.1038/s44459-026-00030-5.
- Gao, Lijun; Yan, Zheng; Gelenbe, Erol (2026). "RobCert: Certifying Robustness of Malicious PDF Detection against Structure-Aware Evasion Attacks". Information Sciences. 752 (123600) 123600. Elsevier. doi:10.1016/j.ins.2026.123600.
