= National Center for Applied Scientific Research =

French research center

- Centre national de la recherche scientifique appliquée
- Predecessor: Office national des recherches scientifiques et industrielles et des inventions (ONRSII)
- Successor: Centre national de la recherche scientifique (CNRS)
- Formation: 24 May 1938
- Dissolved: 19 October 1939
- Type: Research institute
- Headquarters: Pavillon Bellevue, Meudon, France
- Location: France
- Field: Applied research

The National Center for Applied Scientific Research (Centre national de la recherche scientifique appliquée, CNRSA) was a French research organization that existed briefly from 1938 to 1939. It was established by decree on 24 May 1938, replacing the Office national des recherches scientifiques et industrielles et des inventions (ONRSII). The organization ceased to exist on 19 October 1939, when it merged with the Caisse nationale de la recherche scientifique to form the Centre national de la recherche scientifique (CNRS). It was directed by Henri Longchambon, a professor of mineralogy at the Faculty of Sciences in Lyon.

== History ==
The origins of the CNRSA trace back to World War I. In 1915, the French government recognized that German scientists were significantly contributing to their military advantage and decided that France should also mobilize its engineers and academics for research on national defense rather than deploying them to the front, where many perished. Paul Painlevé, a mathematician, was appointed Minister of Public Instruction and created the Directorate of Inventions for National Defense. He appointed Émile Borel and Jean Perrin as head and deputy head of the "Technical Cabinet," respectively, and Jules-Louis Breton as head of the "Commission for the Examination of Inventions for the Army" (Commission des inventions), an entity established in 1877 but previously inactive.

In December 1916, Painlevé left the government, and Breton became Secretary of State for Inventions under Minister of Artillery and Munitions Albert Thomas.

In 1919, the Directorate of Inventions for National Defense was reoriented towards peacetime industrial research and development, becoming the "Directorate of Industrial Research and Inventions," with Breton continuing as director. In 1922, chemist Charles Moureu persuaded deputy Maurice Barrès to advocate in Parliament for scientific research. This effort resulted in a December 1922 law that transformed Breton’s organization into the Office national des recherches scientifiques et industrielles et des inventions (ONRSII), headquartered at Pavillon Bellevue in Meudon.

ONRSII conducted various industrial research projects, including programs for public institutions and the defense sector. Following the economic downturn after the Great Depression, its funding was reduced. A 1933 audit by the Court of Auditors revealed financial mismanagement. While Breton remained director, public subsidies were eliminated. In 1938, due to illness, Breton stepped down from his position.

== Activities of the CNRSA ==
Jean Perrin, who had been Undersecretary of State for Research in the Léon Blum government until its fall on 21 June 1937, briefly returned to office in the new Blum government on 13 March 1938. He drafted a law on national organization in wartime, which was ratified by Parliament on 11 July 1938. This law recognized the role of scientific research in national defense for the first time in France. To implement this, a "High Committee for the Coordination of Scientific Research" was created, with Perrin as its president. When Jules-Louis Breton resigned in late 1938, Perrin decided to dissolve ONRSII and establish a new institution, the CNRSA, which focused on preparing for war.

Jean Zay, once again Minister of National Education, appointed Henri Longchambon as director of the CNRSA. Longchambon stated: "In France, the relationship between research and industry is too often neglected, whereas in the United States, all major companies have research laboratories, some of which are headed by future Nobel laureates, such as the distinguished Irving Langmuir, head of research at General Electric. Twenty years ago, the United Kingdom established its Department of Scientific and Industrial Research (DSIR), a kind of Ministry of Research from which we should take inspiration." Longchambon secured a directive from his supervising minister ordering the armed forces to submit their research requests to the CNRSA, making him responsible for scientific mobilization—aligning with Jean Perrin’s original intent for the organization.

The first task of the center was to catalog all French laboratories. The second was to survey industrial research efforts in other countries, sending representatives to the United Kingdom and the United States. Additionally, thematic commissions were set up to identify major challenges, leading to research funding agreements with laboratories. The CNRSA funded projects such as:

- Development of alternative fuels
- Research into new plastics, an area where France lagged
- Solutions for aircraft icing at high altitudes
- Research on microwaves for aerial navigation, led by Yves Rocard
- Development of mathematical modeling techniques applicable to aeronautics, leading to the creation of the Blaise Pascal Institute
- Research on infrared detector technology for the French Navy, conducted by physicists Louis Néel, André Lallemand, and Paul Soleillet
- Development of ship degaussing techniques to counteract magnetic mines, a project spearheaded by Louis Néel, who later acknowledged that "these studies for the Navy guided my subsequent research on the theory of ferromagnetic properties in weak fields, which I continued in Grenoble."
- Frédéric Joliot's work on nuclear fission, the most ambitious project of the CNRSA, supported by the Ministry of Armament. In May 1939, the center filed three patents related to nuclear energy production and atomic explosives.

On 19 October 1939, the CNRSA was incorporated as one of two divisions of the newly formed Centre national de la recherche scientifique (CNRS), continuing its applied research mission throughout the war. In 1940, the government of Marshal Philippe Pétain dismissed Henri Laugier, director of fundamental sciences, and Henri Longchambon, director of applied sciences. Charles Jacob, a professor of geology at the Sorbonne, was tasked with dismantling the CNRS. However, after assessing its progress, he recognized the organization’s value and convinced the government to maintain it. A law enacted on 10 March 1941 confirmed Jacob as director and renewed contracts relevant to the national economy.
