= National Board of Scientific and Industrial Research and Inventions =

French research organization

National Office for Scientific and Industrial Research and Inventions
- Office national des recherches scientifiques et industrielles et des inventions
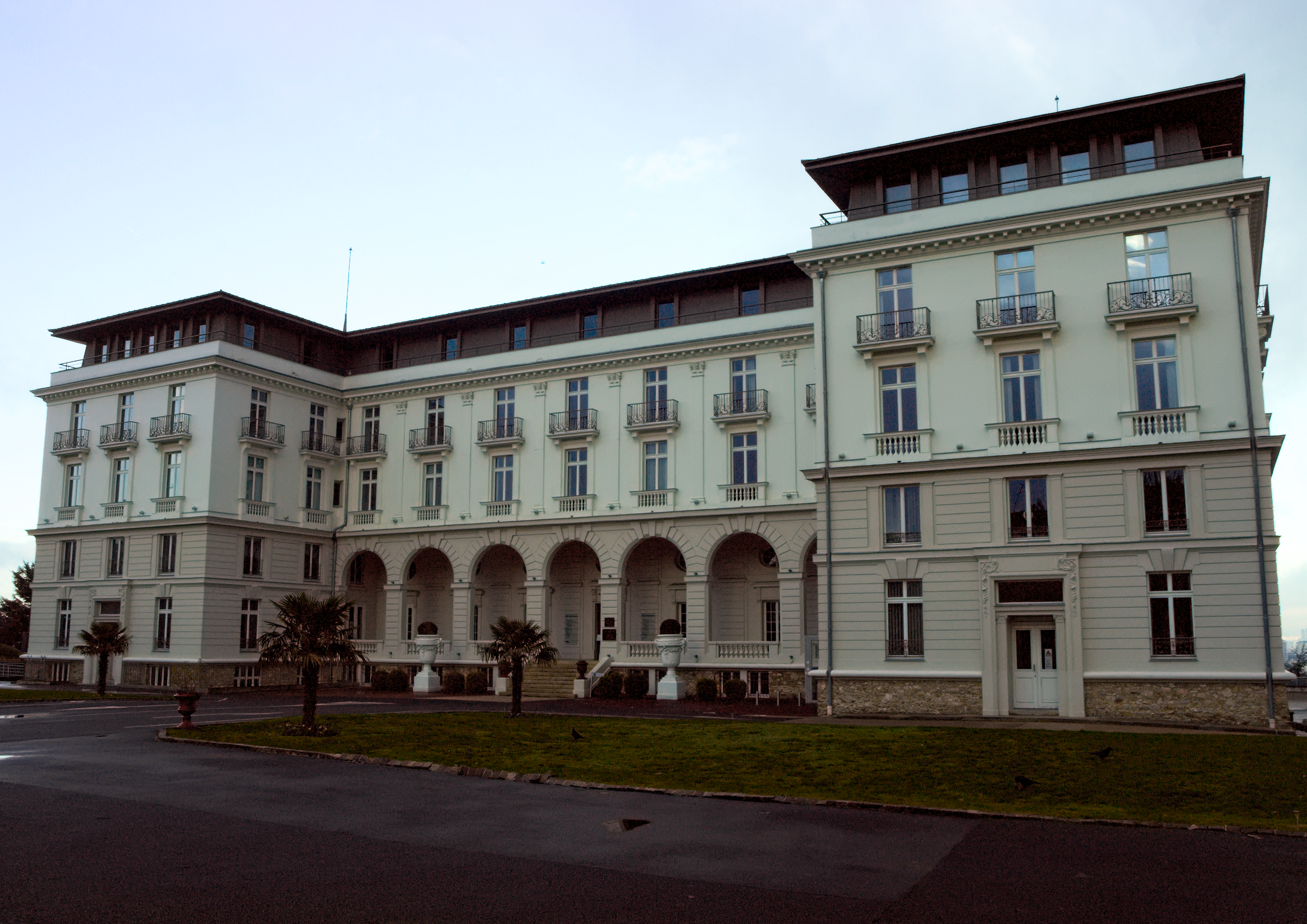
- The Bellevue Pavilion, now managed by the CNRS, formerly housed the Office of Inventions.
- Predecessor: DRSII; DIDN
- Successor: Centre national de la recherche scientifique appliquée (CNRSA)
- Formation: 29 December 1922
- Dissolved: 24 May 1938
- Type: Research institute
- Headquarters: Pavillon Bellevue
- Location: Meudon, France
- Field: Applied research

The National Office for Scientific and Industrial Research and Inventions (Office national des recherches scientifiques et industrielles et des inventions, ONRSII) was a French technological research organization that existed between 1922 and 1938. During that time its director was Jules-Louis Breton.

== Directorate of Inventions for National Defense (1915) ==
After the resignation of the René Viviani government in October 1915, Paul Painlevé became Minister of Public Instruction in the Aristide Briand government. He established the Direction des Inventions intéressant la défense nationale (Directorate of Inventions for National Defense). He appointed Émile Borel and Jean Perrin as head and deputy head of the "Technical Cabinet," respectively, and Jules-Louis Breton as head of the "Commission for the Examination of Inventions for the Army" (Commission des inventions), an entity created in 1877 but previously inactive.

A key innovation of this Directorate was its significant budget. Researchers were required to submit their projects, and the French Army Headquarters would submit its needs to the Technical Committee. Borel and Perrin conducted the initial review before forwarding proposals to the Commission des inventions (led by Breton), which made the final selection through seven expert juries. In December 1916, Painlevé left the government, and Breton became Secretary of State for Inventions in the new Ministry of Artillery and Munitions, led by Albert Thomas.

During the war, the establishment and functioning of the Directorate of Inventions and its Commission were widely appreciated by researchers (both academics and engineers), industrialists, military personnel, and parliamentarians who generously funded their work.

"The spirit of ingenuity and innovation had swept through the entire country, inspiring participation in this endeavor. Thus, at the end of the war, figures like J.-L. Breton were filled with hope. Why not continue this effort in a peacetime context?"

== Directorate of Scientific and Industrial Research and Inventions (1919) ==
The Directorate of Scientific and Industrial Research and Inventions was created in 1919 through an agreement between the Ministry of Public Instruction and the Ministry of Defense, with Jules-Louis Breton retained as its director. He found a strong ally in Henry Le Chatelier, a professor of chemistry at the Sorbonne. In 1901, Le Chatelier wrote:

"My goal is to counter the widespread sentiment in France that science should distance itself from practical applications, avoiding any association with industry as if it were a compromising affiliation."

It became the National Board of Scientific and Industrial Research and Inventions In 1922 after Breton's retirement.

== National Office for Scientific and Industrial Research and Inventions (1922) ==
In 1922, Charles Moureu, a chemist and professor at the Collège de France, who had worked on the Commission for Explosive Substances during the war, convinced deputy Maurice Barrès to campaign in Parliament for the protection of scientific research. This resulted in the passage of a law on 29 December 1922, transforming the organization into the National Office for Scientific and Industrial Research and Inventions (ONRSII). The board of directors included Jean Perrin, an advocate of pure and disinterested science, and Henry Le Chatelier, a supporter of applied science.

The mission of the Office was to "promote, coordinate, and encourage scientific research of all kinds carried out in universities or independently by scholars; but also to develop and coordinate scientific research specifically applied to the advancement of national industry, as well as to conduct studies requested by public services and support inventors."

In 1923, Breton established the Salon des arts ménagers, an exhibition that immediately became a source of revenue for the Office.

The ONRSII headquarters was located at Pavillon Bellevue in Meudon, a former hotel overlooking the Seine that had served as a hospital during World War I. The Office hosted laboratories for various partners:

- Directorate of Petroleum (1923)
- French Committee on Large Dams (1926)
- Magnetism Laboratory of Aimé Cotton, where a 7-tesla electromagnet was built between 1924 and 1928
- Technical Committee for Fire Prevention (1929)
- Société du gaz de Paris
- Syndicat général of the refrigeration industry
- Chamber of Paint and Varnish Manufacturers
- Société des Aciéries de Longwy
- Établissements Saint-Chamond Granat
- Departments of the Ministry of National Defense

However, after the 1929 financial crisis, the ONRSII gradually declined, with dwindling industrial support. In 1933, the Court of Auditors investigated the Office, citing decreased activity and financial mismanagement. Feeling threatened, Breton launched a petition in 1934 to support the institution, similar to Jean Perrin’s successful petition in favor of fundamental research the previous year. Breton gathered signatures from notable academics, including four Nobel laureates: Paul Sabatier and Victor Grignard, both Nobel Prize winners in Chemistry (1912); Charles Richet, Nobel Laureate in Medicine (1913); and Louis de Broglie, Nobel Laureate in Physics (1929). However, the absence of Jean Perrin, Nobel Laureate in Physics (1926), was notable.

The Pierre Laval government preserved the ONRSII but cut its public subsidies, forcing it to rely solely on industrial funding and its own revenue.

In 1938, due to health issues, Jules-Louis Breton was forced to retire. The Office was dissolved and replaced by the Centre national de la recherche scientifique appliquée (CNRSA), under the leadership of Henri Longchambon, professor of mineralogy and Dean of the Faculty of Sciences in Lyon.
