= Louis Rapkine =

French biologist (1904–1948)

Louis Rapkine (July 14, 1904 – December 13, 1948) was a French biologist, specializing in embryology and enzymology. He is best known for his role in saving numerous French scientists from persecution during World War II, and in rebuilding the French scientific community and its institutions after the war.

== Biography ==
=== Early life and family ===
Rapkine was born in the town of Tikhinichi (Belarusian: Ціхінічы) in Belarus, then part of the Russian Empire. As a result of anti-Jewish activity including the Kiev pogrom of 1905, his parents Israël Rapkine and Ida Sorkine moved to Paris in 1911. The family moved again in 1913 to Montréal, where Rapkine studied medicine at McGill University from 1921 to 1924. He returned to Paris in 1924.

Rapkine married Sarah Malamud in New York in 1929, and their daughter Claude was born in Paris in 1932.

=== Career ===
Rapkine became a researcher in Paris and at Cambridge. He pursued biochemical research on the metabolic and developmental roles of sulfhydryl compounds, working initially with Charles Pérez and Maurice Caullery at the Roscoff Maritime Station in 1925. He then worked at the Collège de France under Emmanuel Fauré-Fremiet in 1926.

In 1927, working under René Wurmser, Rapkine began a long research career at the Institut de biologie physico-chimique in Paris, where he served as deputy head of the biophysics department from 1936 to 1940. He published a seminal paper in this area with Serbian biochemist Pavle Trpinac in 1939.

As a foreigner in France in 1936, Rapkine was prohibited from engaging in political activity. According to the Collège de France:

He therefore secretly established the Comité d'Accueil et d'Organisation du Travail des Savants Étrangers (Committee for Hosting and Organizing Work for Foreign Scientists) with support from several scientists, including Paul Langevin, Jean Perrin, Edmond Bauer, Frédéric and Irène Joliot-Curie, and Jacques Hadamard. This committee was established to host Jewish academics who were refugees from Central Europe. Louis Rapkine secured the necessary funding for his initiative, which he then extended to refugees fleeing from Fascism in Spain and Portugal. The committee received funding from the government, but operated using private funds, for which official recognition of the organization by the Front Populaire was crucial. It received donations notably from the Rothschild family, André Mayer, and Robert Debré.

Rapkine, who was 35 at the outbreak of World War II, suspended his research career to devote himself to the French war effort until the end of hostilities. The French government sent Rapkine to London in January 1940, on an official mission to secure a supply of coal for French industrial and military purposes. While in England, he assisted James Crowther in creating an Anglo-French Society of Sciences to formalize scientific cooperation between the two countries. In June 1940, after France's surrender to Germany, Rapkine advocated for the Society to help French scientists find refuge in the United Kingdom, but the Society dissolved when hostilities between France and England foreclosed scientific cooperation. Rapkine and Henri Laugier left London to continue their efforts in the United States.

In New York from 1940 to 1944, Rapkine and Laugier organized the rescue of French scientists and those of other nationalities fleeing occupied France for the United States and Great Britain, with assistance from the Rockefeller Foundation and the government-in-exile of Free France. In 1940 alone, Rapkine's organization assisted 35 scientists in secretly emigrating from France. Rapkine was officially named the head of the New York Bureau Scientifique de la France Libre (Free France scientific bureau) in December 1941.

Rapkine also continued to seek a haven in London for refugee scientists. In 1943, Rapkine assisted Crowther in founding the Society for Visiting Scientists (SVS). Under its auspices as France's representative, Rapkine again undertook to gather exiled French scientists in England. As early as October 1943, the project had obtained a formal agreement from the Provisional French Government, but travel had become impossible. Rapkine complained directly to General Charles de Gaulle about the delays, noting that some of the exiled French scientists had already resigned their positions, and suggesting that travel restrictions could be lifted if the scientists were invited as scientific counselors of the French Army.

After the liberation of Paris at the end of August 1944, Rapkine was sent to London to establish a French scientific mission there, joined later by Frédéric Joliot-Curie. Through October 1945, the London mission hosted scientists returning from America, as well as those who had been isolated in France during the German occupation.

Rapkine returned to Paris, where he resumed his scientific work as the founding department head of a new department of cellular chemistry at the Pasteur Institute, where he continued his research from 1946 until his death in 1948. During this period, he also was instrumental in securing American funds for exiled scientists to return to France or the United Kingdom, and for the reestablishment of French scientific facilities, including securing funding from the Rockefeller Foundation to reestablish the French National Center for Scientific Research (CNRS) led by Fréderic Joliot-Curie.

=== Legacy ===
Louis Rapkine died in Paris from cancer in 1948. He has been honored for his intellectual and moral impact on scientists, including the young Jacques Monod.

The Rapkine French Scientist Fund, overseen by Bethsabée de Rothschild, was established in New York in 1951 to provide support and purchase materials for French scientists. Renamed the Pasteur Foundation in 1985, the fund became the U.S. affiliate of the Pasteur Institute.

In April 2019, a conference on Louis Rapkine was presented in Paris at the Institute of Physical and Chemical Biology, in celebration of the 80th anniversary of CNRS. Rapkine's service to his peers, starting in 1936 and including his role in saving an elite corps of French scientists from wartime persecution, was retraced using the Institute's unpublished archives.

== Awards ==
- Prix Pourat, Académie des Sciences (1932)
- Legion of Honour (Chevalier, 1947)

== Selected publications ==
- Rapkine, L. (1931). "Sur les processus chimiques au cours de la division cellulaire". Annales de Physiologie et de physicochimie Biologique (in French). 7: 382–418.
- Rapkine, L. (1938). "Sulfhydryl groups and enzymic oxido-reduction". Biochemical Journal. 32 (10): 1729–1739. doi:10.1042/bj0321729. PMC 1264248. PMID 16746805.
- Rapkine, L. (1938). "Role des groupements sulfhydriles dans l'activite de l'oxydoreductase du triosephosphate". Comptes Rendus de l'Académie des Sciences (in French). 207. Paris: 301–304.
- Rapkine, L.; Trpinac, P. (1939). "Le role des groupements sulfhydriles des proteines dans l'activite des deshydrases". Comptes Rendus des Séances de la Société de Biologie (in French). 130: 1916–1918.
- Rapkine, L.; Rapkine, S.M.; Trpinac, P. (1939). "Effet de protection de la cozymase sur les groupements sulfhydriles des deshydrases". Comptes Rendus de l'Académie des Sciences (in French). 209. Paris: 253–255.
- Rapkine, L.; Brachet, J. (1951). "Recherches sur le role des groupes sulfhydriles dans la morphogenese. I. Action des inhibiteurs des groups -SH sur l'oeuf entier et sur des explantats dorsaux et ventraux chez les amphibiens". Bulletin de la Société de Chimie Biologique (in French). 33: 427–438.
