= Nine Choucroun =

French biochemist and chemist (1896–1978)

- Born: Fortunée Schecroun; October 6, 1896; Oran
- Died: December 10, 1978 (aged 82); Limeil-Brévannes
- Known for: Developer, with others, of electrophoresis
- Spouse: Jean Perrin

Nine Choucroun, born Fortunée Schecroun (October 6, 1896 – December 10, 1978) was a French biochemist. She was director of research at the Institut de biologie physico-chimique in Paris. She developed, inter alia, the electrophoresis.

Collaborator of Jean Perrin, she became his partner after the death of his wife Henriette Perrin-Duportal in 1938. She managed to board the ocean liner Massilia that allowed them to escape with part of the French government in June 1940 to Casablanca, boarding later the SS Excambion in December 1941, arriving in New York City on December 23, 1941.

== Nine Choucroun Prize ==
Nine Choucroun wanted to encourage young researchers to research in the area, very wide, from the physico-chemical biology. The Nine Choucroun Prize, annual, was created in December 1980 by her heirs. The value of the prize until 2008 was €5,000 and has been raised to €8,000 in 2011. This prize, awarded under the auspices of the physico-chemical Biology Institute and the Edmond de Rothschild Foundation, is aimed at young researchers working in the field of physico-chemical biology.
