= La Revue du mois =

20th century scientific and literary journal

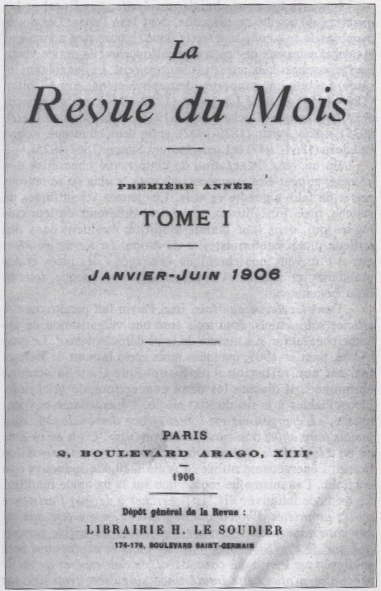
Cover of volume I of La Revue du mois January–June 1906.

La Revue du mois was a scientific and literary journal founded in 1906 by Émile Borel and his wife Marguerite Appell (called Camille Marbo). Its editorial board included Jean Perrin, Paul Langevin, Aimé Cotton, Jacques Duclaux, Henri Mouton, Robert Lespieau, Noël Bernard and Louis-Jacques Simon. Léon Blum, Paul Painlevé and Édouard Herriot also participated in this magazine.

120 issues were published until 1915; The publication, interrupted by the First World War, resumed in 1919 and 1920 at a bimonthly rate (issues 121–132), then, after a new interruption, it resumed in 1923 and stopped definitively in 1926 with issue 1793.
