= Noël Bernard (botanist) =

French botanist

Professor Noël Bernard
- Noël Bernard
- Born: 13 March 1874; Paris
- Died: 16 January 1911 (aged 36); Saint-Benoît, Vienne
- Education: Ecole Normale Supèrieure
- Known for: Discovery of the symbiotic germination of orchid seeds, Discovery of Phytoalexins
- Spouse: Marie-Louise Martin
- Children: 1
- Scientific career
- Fields: botany
- Workplaces: Pasteur Institute, University of Poitiers
- Thesis: Studies on tuberization (1901)
- Doctoral advisor: J. Constantin

Noël Pierre Joseph León Bernard (13 March 1874 in the 17th arrondissement of Paris – 16 January 1911 in Saint-Benoît, Vienne) was a French botanist, known as the famous discoverer of the symbiotic germination of orchid seeds. He also discovered Phytoalexins which are antimicrobial and often antioxidative substances synthesized de novo by plants that accumulate rapidly at areas of pathogen infection.

== Early life and education ==
His father was François Bernard, a wealthy cloth and textiles distributor based in Béziers in southern France, who moved to Paris and died when Bernard was 5 years old. His mother was Marie-Marguerite, who worked as a milliner to fund his studies. Bernard was considered an outstanding student while attending the Lycée Charlemagne later Lycée Condorcet senior high schools, both located in Paris, in preparation for entry to the Grandes Ecoles, of which he eventually gained entry to the grand school École Normale Supérieure. Bernard eventually gained a Bachelor of Science with Honours between 1895 and 1897 in Mathematics, Physics, Biology and Geology. Around the same time, he started giving lessons to repay his mothers debts, sometimes to royal families, e.g. Martha, Princess Bibesco, which was ironic as he considered himself an anarchist. In 1898, he prepared for the prestigious Agrégation Des Sciences Naturelles examination for selection of high school teachers. He shared first place with Charles Pérez, the future Professor of Zoology.

== Career ==
In 1898, Noël Bernard, started a thesis on orchids at the botany department of the Ecole Normale Supèrieure under Professor J. Constantin with a thesis entitled: Studies on tuberization in 1901. He also took a courses in microbiology at the Pasteur Institute, taught by Émile Duclaux, Roux and Élie Metchnikoff.

At the age of 25, while out a walk in the Fontainebleau forest close to Melun he discovered a dead, broken inflorescence of the achlorophyllous orchid Neottia nidus-avis that suggested to him a theory for orchid seed germination. He presented his ideas regarding the orchid seed germination to the French Academy of Sciences in the same year.

Bernard had made an enemy at the Ecole Normale Supérieure in Gaston Bonnier, who failed to support Bernard for a full professorship. Bonnier called Bernard the l’homme aux tubercules, the tuber guy, and pushed him to move to Caen. In 1899, Bernard was offered an assistant professorship at Caen Botanical Institute headed by Octave Lignier. After Bernard's death, Bonnier told Bernard's family that he regretted not having enrolled Bernard in his own laboratory.

In 1908 he was appointed a professor at the University of Poitiers to teach botany. He worked primarily on the mycorrhizae in the role of orchid seed germination. He demonstrated at the Botanical Institute of the Garden of plants of Caen the symbiosis of the fungi in the tuberated roots of orchids. He participated in the creation of the plant research station of Mauroc in Saint-Benoît. With the mathematician Émile Borel, biologist Maurice Caullery and the physicist Aimé Cotton, he co-published the scientific and literary journal La Revue du mois.

== Personal life ==
The greenhouse in Caen Botanical Garden by Jardin des plantes de la ville de Caen, where Bernard conducted his most important research. 1909

In 1907, he married Marie-Louise Martin, a mathematician from the Ecole Normale Supérieure de Fontenay-aux-Roses.They had a son, Francis. Bernard died when he was finally overcome with tuberculosis.

== Publications ==
- Etudes sur la tubérisation [Texte imprimé] / par M. Noe͏̈l Bernard / Paris : P. Dupont, 1901
- Etudes sur la tubérisation [Texte imprimé] / par Noël Bernard... / Paris : P. Dupont, 1902
- Mécanismes physiques d'actions parasitaires [Texte imprimé] / Noël Bernard / Caen, 1902
- Conditions physiques de la tubérisation chez les végétaux [Texte imprimé] / par M. Noel Bernard / [Paris : Gauthier-Villars, 1902]
- La germination des orchidées [Texte imprimé] / par M. Noel Bernard / [Paris : Gauthier-Villars, 1903]
- Nouvelles espèces d'endophytes d'orchidées [Texte imprimé] / par M. Noël Bernard / [Paris : Gauthier-Villars, 1905]
- Symbioses d'orchidées et de divers champignons endophytes [Texte imprimé] / par M. Noel Bernard / [Paris : Gauthier-Villars, 1906]
- Remarques sur l'immunité chez les plantes [Texte imprimé] / par Noël Bernard / Paris : Masson, 1909
- L'évolution des plantes / par Noël Bernard; préface de J. Costantin / Paris : F. Alcan, 1916
- Notions générales sur le paludisme et les moyens de le combattre dans les Centres agricoles et forestiers de la Cochinchine / Noel Bernard / Saïgon : Imprimerie Nouvelle Marcel Portail, 1919
- Principes de biologie végétale [Texte imprimé] / par Noël Bernard / Paris : Félix Alcan, 1921
- L'évolution des plantes [Texte imprimé] / par Noël Bernard,...; préf. de J. Costantin,... / Nouvelle éd. / Paris : Félix Alcan, 1932
- On the germination of Orchids [Texte imprimé] / by Noël Bernard... / London, [1907]
- La culture des orchidées dans ses rapports avec la symbiose [Texte imprimé] : conférence faite à Gand, le 24 avril 1908, aux membres du jury et aux exposants de la XVIe exposition internationale d'horticulture, à l'occasion du centenaire de la Société royale d'agriculture et de botanique de Gand : publiée par les soins de la Société / Noël Bernard / Gand (belgique) : E. Sacré, [1908?]
- L'évolution dans la symbiose [Texte imprimé] : les orchidées et leurs champignons commensaux / par Noël Bernard / Paris : Masson et Cie, Éditeurs, [1909?]
