= Francis Perrin (physicist) =

French physicist (1901–1992)

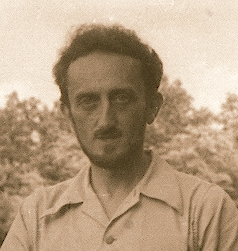
- Born: August 17, 1901; Paris, France
- Died: July 4, 1992 (aged 90); Paris, France
- Education: École Normale Supérieure
- Parents: Jean Perrin (father); Henriette Perrin-Duportal (mother)
- Scientific career
- Fields: Nuclear physics
- Workplaces: Collège de France; CEA

Francis Perrin (17 August 1901 – 4 July 1992) was a French physicist, who worked on nuclear physics, fission and neutrinos. He was the high-commissioner Commissariat à l'énergie atomique (Atomic Energy Commission, CEA) in France and a collaborator of CERN. He was involved in the development of nuclear weapons for France and the cooperation with Israel on nuclear research.

== Early life and education ==
Francis Perrin was born in Paris on 17 August 1901, to writer Henriette Perrin-Duportal and to physicist Jean Perrin, later a Nobel laureate. He attended École Normale Supérieure in Paris. In 1928 he obtained a doctorate in mathematical sciences from the faculté des sciences of Paris, based upon a thesis on Brownian motion and became a faculty member of Collège de France.

== Career ==
In 1933, in connection with the neutrino, Francis Perrin estimated that "the mass must be null—or at least small compared to the mass of the electron". Subsequently, he worked at the Collège de France on the fission of uranium. With Frédéric Joliot and his group, he established in 1939 the possibility of nuclear chain reactions and nuclear energy production.

He was professor at the Collège de France in the chair of Atomic and Molecular Physics from 1946 to 1972. He was the French high-commissioner for atomic energy from 1951 to 1970.

Perrin actively supported the project for a European nuclear research centre, and was a signatory for France to the Convention establishing the CERN Provisional Council in February 1952 in Geneva. He was elected vice-president of this council, and remained French delegate on the CERN Council until 1972.

== Nuclear High-Commissioner ==
Named High-Commissioner of the Commissariat à l'énergie atomique (Atomic Energy Commission, CEA) in 1951—to replace Frédéric Joliot-Curie dismissed because he was opposed to military research—, Francis Perrin joined a lobby of about a dozen people, composed of politicians like Chaban-Delmas, Bourguès-Maunoury and Félix Gaillard, of military officers, like the generals Ailleret, Gallois, and Crépin, of technocrats like Pierre Guillaumat and Raoul Dautry or of scientists like Yves Rocard and Bertrand Goldschmidt, who revealed themselves to be extremely effective. This lobby imposed on successive governments of the Fourth Republic an intensive research program to permit France to deploy nuclear weapons without any real political control from outside France. Secret departments were made up within the CEA to implement this policy as of 1954. General Charles de Gaulle was informed of the work during his "Crossing of the Desert" (1953/58), in particular by Chaban-Delmas. When de Gaulle returned to power in 1958, the progress of the work was such that the date of the first nuclear test was already fixed at 1960.

In 1986 he stated publicly that in 1949 Israeli scientists were invited to the Saclay Nuclear Research Centre, this cooperation leading to a joint effort including sharing of knowledge between French and Israeli scientists especially those with knowledge from the Manhattan Project.

== Personal life ==
Francis Perrin married Colette Auger, the sister of the physicist Pierre Auger. Francis Perrin was the president of Union des Athées (Union of Atheists) after his resignation from the French atomic energy commission.

A French research laboratory, associating the Atomic Energy Commissariat and the National Centre for Scientific Research, was named after him.

== Works ==
- Etude mathématique du mouvement brownien de rotation (thèse de doctorat) (1928)/A mathematical study of rotation brownian motion
- La Fluorescence des solutions, induction moléculaire, polarisation et durée d'émission, photochimie (1929)/Solutions fluorescence, molecular induction, polarisation and emission duration, photochemistry
- Fluorescence (1931)/Fluorescence
- La dynamique relativiste et l'inertie de l'énergie (1932)/Relativistic dynamics and energy inertia
- Théorie quantique des transferts d'activation entre molécules de même espèce. Cas des solutions fluorescentes (1932)/Quantum theory of activation transfer between molecules of same species, the case of fluorescent solutions
- Calcul relatif aux conditions eventuelles de transmutation en chaine de l’uranium (1939)/Calculation relative to eventual conditions of chain transmutation of uranium
- Traité du calcul des probabilités et de ses applications, avec Émile Borel (1939)/Work on probability calculation and its applications, with Émile Borel
- Valeurs internationales des sections efficaces des isotopes fissiles pour les neutrons thermiques (1955)/International values of cross sections of fissil isotopes for thermic neutrons
- L'Euratom (1956)/Euratom
- Funérailles nationales de Frédéric Joliot (1958)/National obituary of Frederic Joliot
- Leçon terminale, Chaire de physique atomique et moléculaire (1972)/Terminal lesson, atomic and molecular physics pulpit
- Écrits de Francis Perrin (1998)/Writings of Francis Perrin
