= Longchambon =

Longchambon is a French surname. Notable people with the surname include:

- Henri Longchambon (1896–1969), French politician and scientist
- Samia Longchambon (born 1982), English actress
- Sylvain Longchambon (born 1980), French ice dancer
