= Henriette Perrin-Duportal =

French writer and historian (1869–1938)

- Born: 15 April 1869
- Died: 9 November 1938 (aged 69)
- Spouse: Jean Perrin
- Children: 2, including Francis
- Writing career
- Genres: children's literature nonfiction

Henriette Perrin-Duportal (15 April 1869 – 9 November 1938) was a French writer, historian, author of children's books and school textbooks. She was also known for her articles on the role of the women of Besançon during the French Revolution, published in the Annales révolutionnaires. A friend of Marie Curie, she and her husband, Jean Perrin, were staunch allies of Curie during the Langevin Affair, and took care of her eldest daughter Irène when the Curies had to temporarily leave their home for safety.

== Early life and education ==
Henriette Jeanne Eugenie Blanche Duportal was born in Bastia, Corsica, on 15 April 1869, the daughter of Élise Jeanne Mayet-Tissot and Henri Simon Duportal, a Republican and a graduate of the École des Ponts et Chaussées. Her paternal grandfather was Armand Duportal, a Member of Parliament and Prefect of Haute-Garonne. The family ensured their daughters had an excellent education. In 1914, her elder sister, Jeanne Duportal, became the first woman in France to be awarded a doctorate in literature. Her brother Armand became a mining engineer, sisters Caroline and France and brother Max studied law, the latter two being called to the bar in Paris, and Henri became a journalist.

Duportal studied under Marxist historian Albert Mathiez, who held Sorbonne chair in French Revolutionary Studies and was the founder of the Societe des Etudes Robespierristes.

== Career ==
Between 1907 and 1909, Duportal-Perrin taught French literature to the children, including her own, who attended The Cooperative, a form of home school set up by Marie and Pierre Curie, with friends and fellow parents connected with the Sorbonne.

Duportal-Perrin published a lengthy study on the women's club in Besançon during the French Revolution in the Annales révolutionnaires between 1917 and 1918. She came to be regarded as a pioneer in this field.

She also wrote children's books, illustrated by her daughter, Aline Lapicque-Perrin, or by Joseph Kuhn-Régnier, as well as school textbooks.

== Personal life ==
On 31 August 1897 she married the physicist Jean Perrin, a schoolmate of her brother at the Lycée Janson-de-Sailly. The couple had two children, Aline Lapicque-Perrin who worked as an illustrator and Francis Perrin, who became a physicist Jean Perrin was awarded the Nobel Prize in Physics in 1926.

The Perrins were good friends of Marie Curie, and were active in supporting her and her two daughters Irene and Eve during the Langevin Affair, when Curie's friendship with Paul Langevin caused a scandal that threatened her career. Henriette looked after and taught Irene during this time. Jean Perrin later said "But for the five of us (Jean and Henriette Perrin, Émile and Marguerite Borel and André-Louis Debierne) who stood up for Marie Curie against a whole world when a landslide of filth engulfed her, Marie would have returned to Poland and we would have been marked by eternal shame".

She died in Paris on 9 November 1938.

== Selected publications ==
- Mon livre d'histoires, lectures illustrées (enseignement primaire, cours préparatoire), (My Storybook, illustrated readings (primary education, Year 1)), 94 engravings, Paris, Éditions Larousse, 1911.
- Histoire merveilleuse du roi-chevalier, (The Wonderful Tale of the Knight-King) Paris, Éditions Larousse, 1915.
- «Le club de femmes de Besançon», Annales révolutionnaires, ‘The Besançon Women’s Club’, Annales révolutionnaires 1917, IX, 629-653; and 1918, X, 37-63, 503-532, 643-672 The *Annales historiques de la Révolution française* is a French quarterly historical journal, founded by Albert Mathiez in 1908.
- Nos alliés les Américains (Our Allies, the Americans) Number 207 in the Les Livres Roses pour les Jeunesse, Larousse (Paris), 1917, featuring a quotation from Kiffin Rockwell, the first American pilot to shoot down an enemy aircraft in World War I.
- Georgie à la montagne. Album pour les parents et les enfants. (Georgie in the Mountains. A picture book for parents and children). Illustrations by Kuhn-Régnier 1927.
- Lise et Jean, lectures des petits, lectures pour les enfants de 6 à 8 ans, écoles primaires, lycées et collèges de garçons et de filles, (Lise and Jean: Readings for Young Children, for children aged 6 to 8, primary schools, and secondary schools for boys and girls) with A. Mathieu, Paris, Éditions Delagrave, 1928.
- Pour la vie morale de nos enfants, textes, lectures, réflexions, (For the Moral Upbringing of Our Children: Texts, Readings and Reflections) Paris, Fernand Nathan, 1928.
- Dick et Georgie, Paris, Fernand Nathan,1929, Illustrations by Joseph Kuhn-Régnier
- Histoires simples à raconter par les mamans à leurs petits garçons et à leurs petites filles, (Simple Stories for Mothers to Tell Their Little Boys and Girls) Paris, Fernand Nathan, 1930.
- Mon livre d’histoires: (My Storybook) illustrated with 94 engravings, Larousse, Paris, 1930.
- Georgie chez sa cousine Lili, (Georgie at her cousin Lili’s) Paris, Fernand Nathan,1932, illustrations by Joseph Kuhn-Régnier
- Georgie au cirque, (Georgie at the Circus), a picture book for parents and children, illustrations by Joseph Kuhn-Régnier, Paris, Fernand Nathan, 1933, 1928.
- Explique-moi maman!: la terre et la nature, (‘Explain it to me, Mummy!’: The Earth and Nature) Paris, Fernand Nathan, 1933.
- Conseils sur l'éducation, (Advice on Education), Paris, Editions Garnier Frères.

== See also ==
- List of women associated with Marie Curie and Irène Joliot-Curie
