= Borel distribution =

Probability distribution for branching processes

- Parameters: $\mu \in [0,1]$
- Support: $n \in \{1, 2, 3,\ldots\}$
- PMF: $\frac{e^{-\mu n}(\mu n)^{n-1}}{n!}$
- Mean: $\frac{1}{1-\mu}$
- Variance: $\frac{\mu}{(1-\mu)^3}$
- PGF: $-\frac{1}{\mu} W_0(-e^{-\mu}\mu z)\,\, \text{for}\,\, |z|< \frac{e^{\mu-1}}{\mu}$ where $W_0(z)$ is the Lambert W function

The Borel distribution is a discrete probability distribution, arising in contexts including branching processes and queueing theory. It is named after the French mathematician Émile Borel.

If the number of offspring that an organism has is Poisson-distributed, and if the average number of offspring of each organism is no bigger than 1, then the descendants of each individual will ultimately become extinct. The number of descendants that an individual ultimately has in that situation is a random variable distributed according to a Borel distribution.

== Definition ==
A discrete random variable X is said to have a Borel distribution with parameter μ ∈ [0,1] if the probability mass function of X is given by

$$P_\mu(n)= \Pr(X=n)= \frac{e^{-\mu n}(\mu n)^{n-1}}{n!}$$

for n = 1, 2, 3 ....

== Derivation and branching process interpretation ==
If a Galton–Watson branching process has common offspring distribution Poisson with mean μ, then the total number of individuals in the branching process has Borel distribution with parameter μ.

Let X be the total number of individuals in a Galton–Watson branching process. Then a correspondence between the total size of the branching process and a hitting time for an associated random walk gives

$$\Pr(X=n)=\frac{1}{n}\Pr(S_n=n-1)$$

where S_{n} = Y_{1} + … + Y_{n}, and Y_{1} … Y_{n} are independent identically distributed random variables whose common distribution is the offspring distribution of the branching process. In the case where this common distribution is Poisson with mean μ, the random variable S_{n} has Poisson distribution with mean μn, leading to the mass function of the Borel distribution given above.

Since the mth generation of the branching process has mean size μ^{m − 1}, the mean of X is

$$1+\mu+\mu^2+\cdots = \frac 1 {1-\mu}.$$

== Queueing theory interpretation ==
In an M/D/1 queue with arrival rate μ and common service time 1, the distribution of a typical busy period of the queue is Borel with parameter μ.

== Properties ==
If P_{μ}(n) is the probability mass function of a Borel(μ) random variable, then the mass function P^{∗}_{μ}(n) of a sized-biased sample from the distribution (i.e. the mass function proportional to nP_{μ}(n) ) is given by

$$P_\mu^*(n)=(1-\mu)\frac{e^{-\mu n}(\mu n)^{n-1}}{(n-1)!}.$$

Aldous and Pitman show that

$$P_\mu(n)=\frac{1}{\mu} \int_0^\mu P_\lambda^*(n) \, d\lambda.$$

In words, this says that a Borel(μ) random variable has the same distribution as a size-biased Borel(μU) random variable, where U has the uniform distribution on [0,1].

This relation leads to various useful formulas, including

$$\operatorname E\left( \frac 1 X \right) = 1 - \frac \mu 2.$$

== Borel–Tanner distribution ==
The Borel–Tanner distribution generalizes the Borel distribution. Let k be a positive integer. If X_{1}, X_{2}, … X_{k} are independent and each has Borel distribution with parameter μ, then their sum W = X_{1} + X_{2} + … + X_{k} is said to have Borel–Tanner distribution with parameters μ and k. This gives the distribution of the total number of individuals in a Poisson–Galton–Watson process starting with k individuals in the first generation, or of the time taken for an M/D/1 queue to empty starting with k jobs in the queue. The case k = 1 is simply the Borel distribution above.

Generalizing the random walk correspondence given above for k = 1,

$$\Pr(W=n)= \frac k n \Pr(S_n=n-k)$$

where S_{n} has Poisson distribution with mean nμ. As a result, the probability mass function is given by

$$\Pr(W=n)=\frac k n \frac{e^{-\mu n}(\mu n)^{n-k}}{(n-k)!}$$

for n = k, k + 1, ... .
