= M/D/c queue =

Concept in queueing theory

In queueing theory, a discipline within the mathematical theory of probability, an M/D/c queue represents the queue length in a system having c servers, where arrivals are determined by a Poisson process and job service times are fixed (deterministic). The model name is written in Kendall's notation. Agner Krarup Erlang first published on this model in 1909, starting the subject of queueing theory. The model is an extension of the M/D/1 queue which has only a single server.

== Model definition ==
An M/D/c queue is a stochastic process whose state space is the set {0,1,2,3,...} where the value corresponds to the number of customers in the system, including any currently in service.

- Arrivals occur at rate λ according to a Poisson process and move the process from state i to i + 1.
- Service times are deterministic time D (serving at rate μ = 1/D).
- c servers serve customers from the front of the queue, according to a first-come, first-served discipline. When the service is complete the customer leaves the queue and the number of customers in the system reduces by one.
- The buffer is of infinite size, so there is no limit on the number of customers it can contain.

== Waiting time distribution ==
Erlang showed that when ρ = (λ D)/c < 1, the waiting time distribution has distribution F(y) given by

$$F(y) = \int_0^\infty F(x+y-D)\frac{\lambda^c x^{c-1}}{(c-1)!} e^{-\lambda x} \text{d} x, \quad y \geq 0 \quad c \in \mathbb N.$$

Crommelin showed that, writing P_{n} for the stationary probability of a system with n or fewer customers,

$$\mathbb P(W \leq x) = \sum_{n=0}^{c-1} P_n \sum_{k=1}^m \frac{(-\lambda(x-kD))^{(k+1)c-1-n}}{((K+1)c-1-n)!}e^{\lambda(x-kD)}, \quad mD \leq x <(m+1)D.$$
