= Sedimentation equilibrium =

State in which a suspension's settling rate is the same as its diffusion rate

Sedimentation equilibrium in a suspension of different particles, such as molecules, exists when the rate of transport of each material in any one direction due to sedimentation equals the rate of transport in the opposite direction due to diffusion. Sedimentation is due to an external force, such as gravity or centrifugal force in a centrifuge.

It was discovered for colloids by Jean Baptiste Perrin for which he received the Nobel Prize in Physics in 1926.

== Colloid ==
In a colloid, the colloidal particles are said to be in sedimentation equilibrium if the rate of sedimentation is equal to the rate of movement from Brownian motion. For dilute colloids, this is described using the Laplace-Perrin distribution law:

$\Phi(z) = \Phi_0\exp\biggl(-\frac{m^*g}{k_BT}z\biggr)=\Phi_0e^{-z/l_g}$

where

$\Phi(z)$ is the colloidal particle volume fraction as a function of vertical distance $z$ above reference point $z=0$,

$\Phi_0$ is the colloidal particle volume fraction at reference point $z=0$,

$m^*$ is the buoyant mass of the colloidal particles,

$g$ is the standard acceleration due to gravity,

$k_B$ is the Boltzmann constant,

$T$ is the absolute temperature,

and $l_g$ is the sedimentation length.

The buoyant mass is calculated using $m^*=\Delta\rho V_P=\frac{4}{3}\pi\Delta\rho R^3$

where $\Delta\rho$ is the difference in mass density between the colloidal particles and the suspension medium, and $V_P$ is the colloidal particle volume found using the volume of a sphere ($R$ is the radius of the colloidal particle).

=== Sedimentation length ===
The Laplace-Perrin distribution law can be rearranged to give the sedimentation length $l_g$. The sedimentation length describes the probability of finding a colloidal particle at a height $z$ above the point of reference $z=0$. At the length $l_g$ above the reference point, the concentration of colloidal particles decreases by a factor of $e$.

$l_g=\frac{k_B T}{m^* g}$

If the sedimentation length is much greater than the diameter $d$ of the colloidal particles ($l_g>>d$), the particles can diffuse a distance greater than this diameter, and the substance remains a suspension. However, if the sedimentation length is less than the diameter ($l_g<d$), the particles can only diffuse by a much shorter length. They will sediment under the influence of gravity and settle to the bottom of the container. The substance can no longer be considered a colloidal suspension. It may become a colloidal suspension again if an action to undertaken to suspend the colloidal particles again, such as stirring the colloid.

==== Example ====
The difference in mass density $\Delta\rho$ between the colloidal particles of mass density $\rho_1$ and the medium of suspension of mass density $\rho_2$, and the diameter of the particles, have an influence on the value of $l_g$. As an example, consider a colloidal suspension of polyethylene particles in water, and three different values for the diameter of the particles: 0.1 μm, 1 μm and 10 μm. The volume of a colloidal particles can be calculated using the volume of a sphere $V=\frac{4}{3}\pi R^3$.

$\rho_1$ is the mass density of polyethylene, which is approximately on average 920 kg/m^{3} and $\rho_2$ is the mass density of water, which is approximately 1000 kg/m^{3} at room temperature (293K). Therefore $\Delta\rho=\rho_1-\rho_2$ is -80 kg/m^{3}.

$l_g$ for different sizes of polyethylene and silicon particles
Diameter $d$ (μm)	$l_g$ for polyethylene particles (μm)	$l_g$ for silicon particles (μm)
0.01	-9.84×10^{6}	5.92×10^{5}
0.1	-9840	592
1	-9.84	0.592
10	-9.84×10^{−3}	5.92×10^{−4}

Generally, $l_g$ decreases with $d^3$. For the 0.1 μm diameter particle, $l_g$ is larger than the diameter, and the particles will be able to diffuse. For the 10 μm diameter particle, $l_g$ is much smaller than the diameter. As $l_g$ is negative the particles will cream, and the substance will no longer be a colloidal suspension.

In this example, the difference is mass density $\Delta\rho$ is relatively small. Consider a colloid with particles much denser than polyethylene, for example silicon with a mass density of approximately 2330 kg/m^{3}. If these particles are suspended in water, $\Delta\rho$ will be 1330 kg/m^{3}. $l_g$ will decrease as $\Delta\rho$ increases. For example, if the particles had a diameter of 10 μm the sedimentation length would be 5.92×10^{−4} μm, one order of magnitude smaller than for polyethylene particles. Also, because the particles are more dense than water, $l_g$ is positive and the particles will sediment.

== Ultracentrifuge ==
Modern applications use the analytical ultracentrifuge. The theoretical basis for the measurements is developed from the Mason-Weaver equation. The advantage of using analytical sedimentation equilibrium analysis for Molecular Weight of proteins and their interacting mixtures is the avoidance of need for derivation of a frictional coefficient, otherwise required for interpretation of dynamic sedimentation.

Sedimentation equilibrium can be used to determine molecular mass. It forms the basis for an analytical ultracentrifugation method for measuring molecular masses, such as those of proteins, in solution.
