= Directorate of Inventions for National Defense =

French research institute

- Direction des Inventions intéressant la défense nationale
- Successor: National Office for Scientific and Industrial Research and Inventions (ONRSII)
- Formation: 1915
- Dissolved: 1922
- Type: Research institute
- Headquarters: France

The Directorate of Inventions for National Defense (Direction des Inventions intéressant la défense nationale) was a French weapons research institute.

The directorate was established within the Ministry of Public Instruction, Fine Arts, and Inventions for National Defense by decree on 13 November 1915, at the initiative of Minister Paul Painlevé who after the resignation of the René Viviani government in October 1915, had become Minister of Public Instruction in the Aristide Briand government. He established the Directorate of Inventions and appointed Émile Borel and Jean Perrin as respectively head and deputy head of the "Technical Cabinet" and Jules-Louis Breton as head of the "Commission for the Examination of Inventions for the Army" (Commission des inventions), an entity created in 1877 but previously inactive. In form it was a governmental body operating under various ministries from 1915 to 1919. It was briefly transformed into a State Secretariat in 1917.

During World War I, its primary mission was to ensure the scientific mobilization and coordination of laboratories. The directorate was also responsible for examining inventions submitted by inventors and conducting research requested by the Ministries of War and the Navy. To facilitate this, the High Commission of Inventions (Commission supérieure des inventions) was attached to the directorate. A key innovation of this Directorate was its significant budget.

The directorate comprised 49 members. Researchers were required to submit their projects, and the French Army Headquarters would submit its needs to the Technical Committee.

Any project submitted to the directorate had to be reviewed initially by the technical cabinet headed by Borel and Perrin before being assigned to the High Commission led by Breton, which would distribute the projects among its expert sections. The directorate was divided into eight specialized sections: trench warfare, aeronautics, ballistics and armament, mechanics, physics and electricity, naval warfare, chemistry, and hygiene and physiology.

The Ministry of War had earlier established a testing unit in August 1915 led by Alexandre Millerand which used the testing laboratory of the Conservatoire national des arts et métiers.

Following a ministerial reshuffle of 12 December 1916, Painlevé left the government. The directorate was transformed into a service and transferred to the Armaments and War Production Ministry. Jules-Louis Breton became Secretary of State for Inventions in the new Ministry of Artillery and Munitions, led by Albert Thomas. Breton was specifically tasked with overseeing this service. Over time, he held several titles: Undersecretary of State for Inventions, then Under-Secretary of State for Inventions, Studies, and Technical Experiments, and finally, Under-Secretary of State for Inventions for National Defense.

From 14 April 1917, the State Secretariat was composed of the following entities:

- The High Commission of Inventions
- The Service for Inventions, Studies, and Technical Experiments in Artillery
- The Inspection of Studies and Technical Experiments in Small Arms
- The Service for Inventions, Studies, and Technical Experiments in Powders and Explosives
- The Service for Inventions, Studies, and Technical Experiments in Automobiles

With the appointment of Paul Painlevé as President of the Council, the Under-Secretariat was placed under the supervision of the Ministry of War, led by Painlevé himself, and was attached to the Engineering Section. Following Painlevé's resignation in November 1917, the Under-Secretariat returned to the Ministry of Armament and was once again reduced to a simple directorate.

During the war, the establishment and functioning of the Directorate of Inventions and its Commission were widely appreciated by researchers (both academics and engineers), industrialists, military personnel, and parliamentarians who generously funded their work.

"The spirit of ingenuity and innovation had swept through the entire country, inspiring participation in this endeavor. Thus, at the end of the war, figures like J.-L. Breton were filled with hope. Why not continue this effort in a peacetime context?"

In April 1919, the Directorate was transferred to the Ministry of Public Instruction and renamed the Directorate of Scientific and Industrial Research and Inventions. It was eventually merged in 1923 into the newly created National Office for Scientific and Industrial Research and Inventions (ONRSII).
