= Carl Benedicks =

Swedish physicist

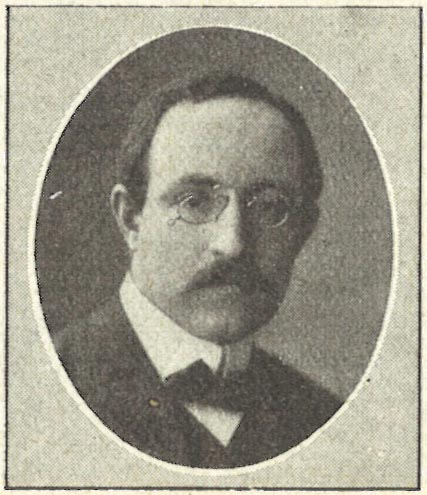
- Carl Benedicks around 1910
- Born: 27 May 1875; Stockholm
- Died: 16 July 1958 (aged 83)
- Resting place: Adolf Fredrik Church
- Scientific career
- Institutions: Stockholm University

Carl Axel Fredrik Benedicks (27 May 1875 – 16 July 1958) was a Swedish physicist whose work included geology, mineralogy, chemistry, physics, astronomy and mathematics.

== Biography ==
Carl Benedicks was born 27 May 1875 in Stockholm, Sweden to Edward Otto Benedicks and Sofia Elisabet Tholander. He married Cecilia af Geijerstam on 6 October 1899.

Benedicks was a professor at Stockholm's technical university, Director of the Institute of Metallography, and the first to study the yttrium silicate, thalenite. In 1926 Benedicks argued to the Nobel Physics Committee that Jean Baptiste Perrin should receive the Nobel Prize in Physics for his work, over 15 years prior, on Brownian motion, a debate which led to Perrin's eventual nomination and award. Benedicks was awarded a Carnegie Gold medal for his work on the cooling power of liquids, quenching velocities, and the constituents of troostite and austenite.

Benedicks was critical of the Copenhagen interpretation put forward by Niels Bohr and Werner Heisenberg, saying he thought they had resigned themselves to never observing the effects of individual atoms, and that their arguments were no more than that of any pessimist.
