= Camille Marbo =

French writer (1883–1969)

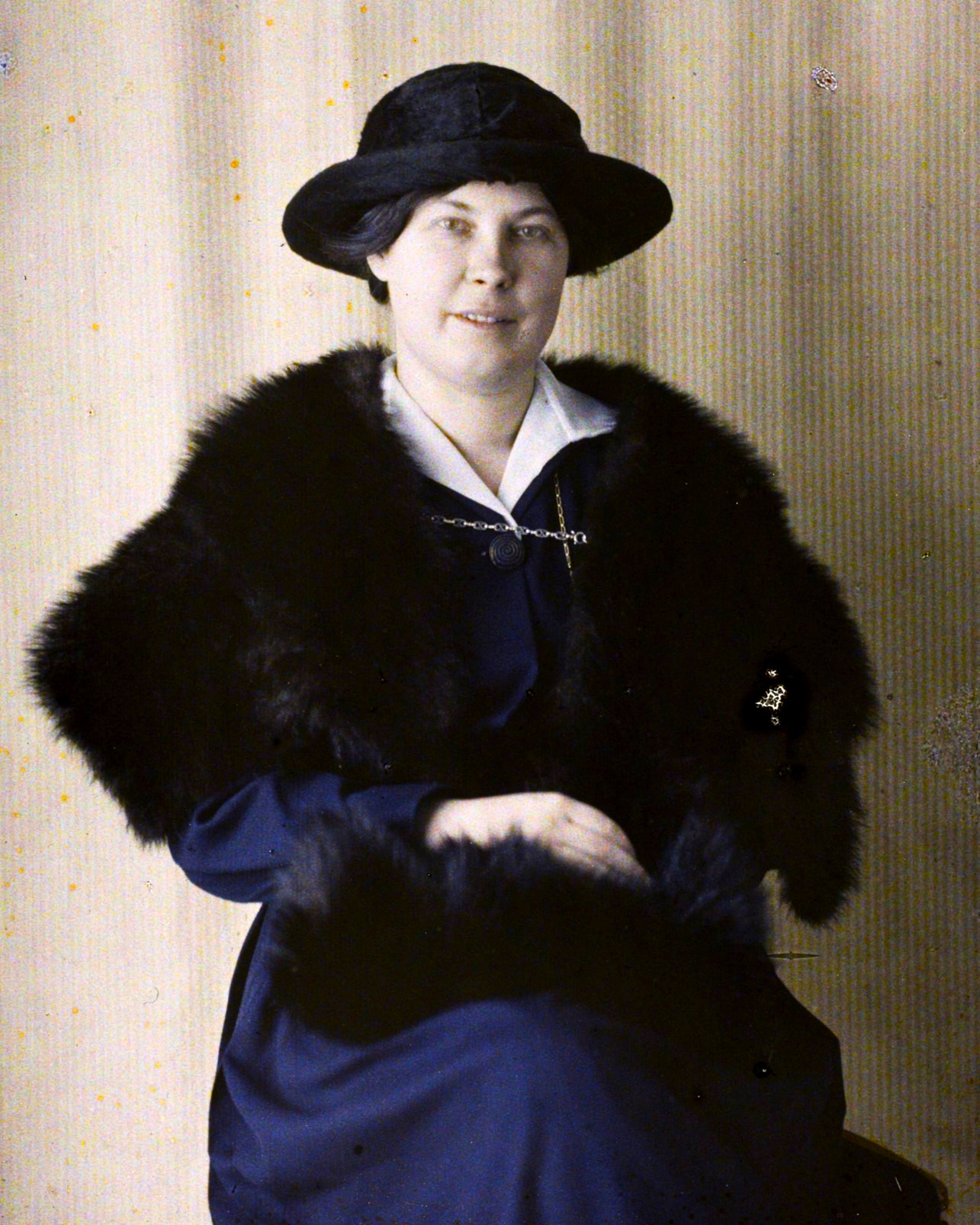
- Autochrome portrait by Auguste Léon, 1917
- Born: Marguerite Appell; April 11, 1883
- Died: 5 February 1969 (aged 85)
- Other name: Marguerite Borel
- Occupation: Writer
- Spouse: Émile Borel
- Father: Paul Appell

Marguerite Borel (née Appell; 11 April 1883 – 5 February 1969), better known for her pen name Camille Marbo (French pronunciation: [kamij maʁbo]), was a 20th-century French writer, president and laureate of the Prix Femina in 1913 and president of the Société des gens de lettres.

== Biography ==
Marguerite Appell was the daughter of the mathematician Paul Appell.

In 1901, she married the mathematician and politician Émile Borel, taking his last name.

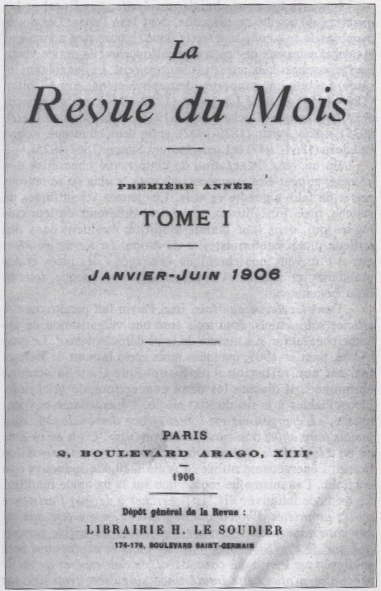
Cover of volume I of La Revue du mois January–June 1906.

In 1906, she created La Revue du mois, a scientific and literary journal, with her husband. The publication allowed contributors the opportunity to choose and discuss subjects as they pleased. Marguerite Borel personally took charge of the critiques of plays, novels, and various chronicles.

When she began writing novels, she chose the pseudonym Camille Marbo, the name Marbo taking the first three letters of her first name Marguerite and the first two of her last name Borel.

In 1913, Camille Marbo was awarded the Prix Femina, then called Prix de la Vie heureuse, for her first novel La statue voilée.

During the First World War, she set up the Comité de secours national, the national relief committee with her father. She also founded and ran a temporary hospital in Paris, which earned her the Medal of French Gratitude. In 1916, she was asked to participate in the organization of women in the workforce in place of the men who had gone to battle. Benefiting from her experience as head of the hospital, she created a recruitment centre for women, which auditioned, tested, and employed both salaried employees and volunteers in the services sector. More than 20,000 women were employed through this program. The treatise she published in 1919, "Mobilization féminine en France", documents the contribution of these women to the Allied victory. This document is notable for its unique content as well as its methodical and professional form. It is carefully contextualized and enriched with statistics.

She wrote about forty other novels, some monographs and memoirs.

A friend of Marie Curie, she welcomed Marie and her daughters into her home and gave them shelter during the "affaire Langevin", a revelation made by the press of an extramarital affair between Marie Curie, a widow at the time, and Paul Langevin.

Marguerite Borel took part in the political life of Saint-Affrique and participated in the electoral campaigns of her husband, Émile Borel. Marguerite herself was deputy mayor of Saint-Affrique from 1947 to 1954.

In February 1928, Camille Marbo succeeded Jean Dornis as president of the Denier des veuves de la SGDL, giving assistance to the widows of writers without resources.

She became president of the Société des gens de lettres in 1937 and was re-elected in 1938 and again after the liberation in 1947. She was also a member of the jury of the Prix Femina and later became its president.

She published her memoirs in 1967 under the title À travers deux siècles, souvenirs et rencontres (1883-1967).

Marguerite died in 1969. She was a Commander of the Legion Of Honour.

== Works ==
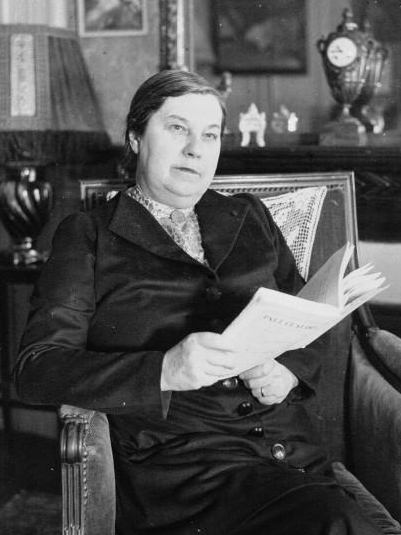
Camille Marbo in 1937, president of the Société des gens de lettres.

- 1906: Christine Rodis
- 1913: La Statue voilée, (Prix Femina in 1913)
- 1918: Le Survivant
- 1924: Les Cahiers de Francine
- 1925: À l'enseigne du Griffon
- 1926: Hélène Barraux (celle qui défiait l'amour)
- 1931: À bord de la "Croix du Sud"
- 1932: Celle qui défiait l'amour
- 1933: Ruth
- 1934: Le Perroquet bleu
- 1936: Flammes juives
- 1938: Les Millions de l'émir
- 1941: Le Créole au cœur ardent
- 1941: Violette et son cœur
- 1943: La Baie des courlis
- 1944: L'Oiseau captif
- 1945: Le Buisson de lilas
- 1945: La Nièce du boucanier
- 1946: La Maison Bartholène
- 1947: L'Enigme du manoir
- 1947: Tante Estelle
- 1948: L'Idole offensée
- 1949: Sous les eucalyptus
- 1949: Le Chateau condamné
- 1950: La Tour carrée
- 1951: La Reine de Golconde
- 1952: Monsieur Charles
- 1953: Douce marraine
- 1953: Jeux de la science et de l'amour
- 1955: Isabelle et le secret
- 1955: Le Visiteur inconnu
- 1956: L'Amie de pension
- 1957: Le Bel héritage
- 1958: Mademoiselle Anaïs
- 1959: La Dame de Maison-Blanche
- 1959: Les Lettres
- 1960: Le Diamant bleu
- 1961: La Dernière nuit
- 1961: Un Étrange garçon
- 1962: Le Fiancé mystérieux
- 1963: La Protectrice
- 1964: Les Amoureux du Castillou
- 1965: L'Énigmatique Sylvio
- 1965: Le Sel de ma vie
- 1966: Mon amour, d'où viens-tu ?
- 1967: À travers deux siècles, souvenirs et rencontres (1883–1967), Paris, Grasset
- 1967: Clara Fontaine

== Distinctions ==
- Commander of the Legion Of Honour.
- Prix Femina, then called Prix de la Vie heureuse, 1913.
- Medal of French Gratitude.

== See also ==
- Émile Borel
- Prix Femina
- Société des gens de lettres

== Bibliography ==
- "Camille Marbo", in Nouveau Dictionnaire national des contemporains, Paris, 1962, vol. 1, p. 579.
- Ross, Mary Ellen (2009). "Marguerite Borel/ Camille Marbo: The Government's feminist". French and francophone women facing war (in French). Berne: Peter Lang. pp. 69–84. ISBN 978-3039113323.
- Mémoires : À travers deux siècles, souvenirs et rencontres (1883–1967), Paris, Éditions Grasset, 1967.
