= Pavillon Bellevue =

Coordinates: 48°49′13″N 2°13′46″E

Bellevue Pavilion of the CNRS
- Pavillon Bellevue du CNRS
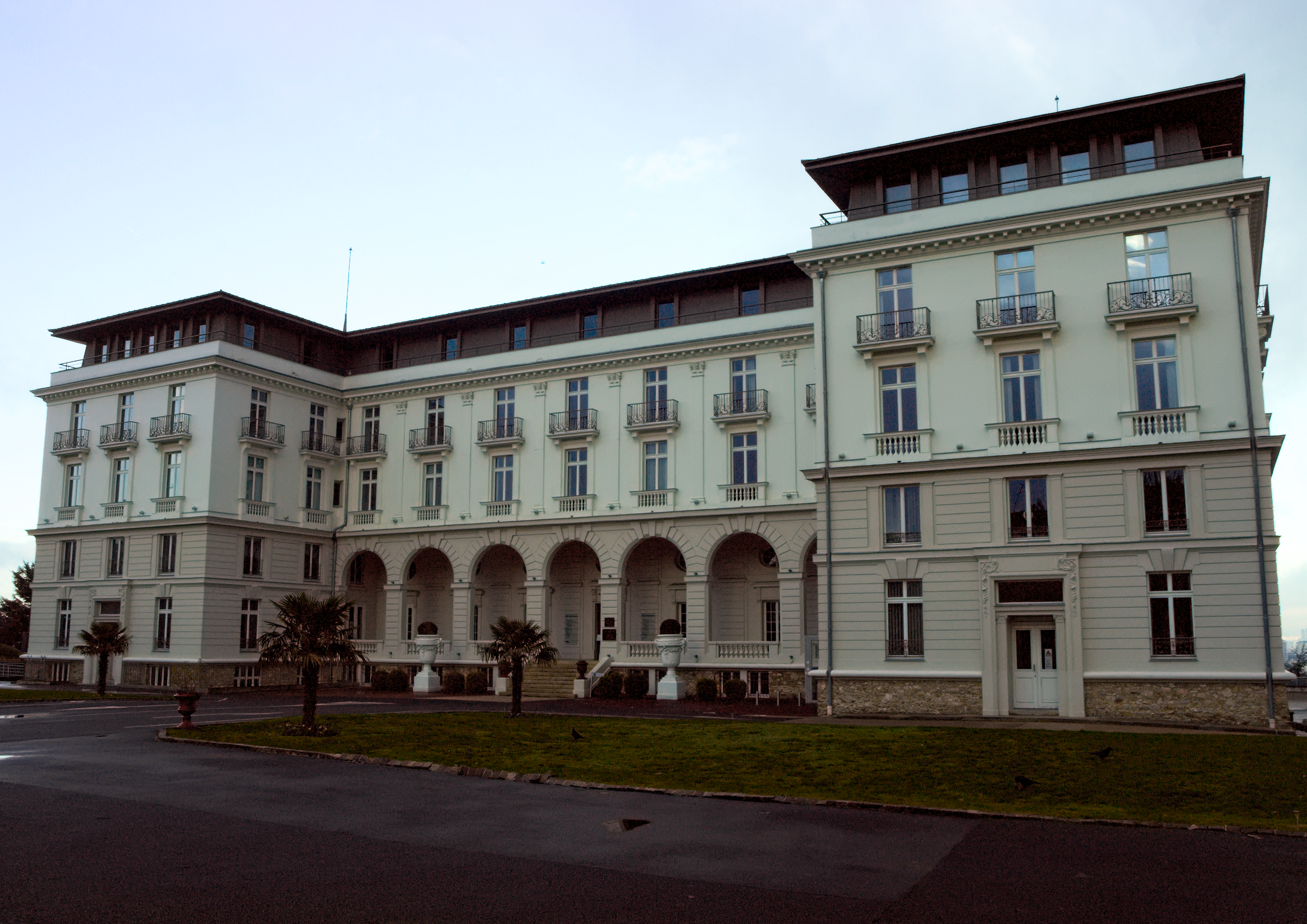

General information
- Current tenants: French National Centre for Scientific Research (CNRS)
- Completed: 1846
- Renovated: 2012

The Bellevue Pavilion of the CNRS (Pavillon Bellevue du CNRS) is a building located in the Bellevue district of Meudon, in the Hauts-de-Seine department, France. Originally, it was a hotel built to accommodate spa patients of the hydrotherapy center founded in 1846 by Dr. Louis Désiré Fleury. Among the notable visitors who stayed there were Théodore de Banville and actor Frédérick Lemaître in 1857, as well as Édouard Manet with his wife in 1879.

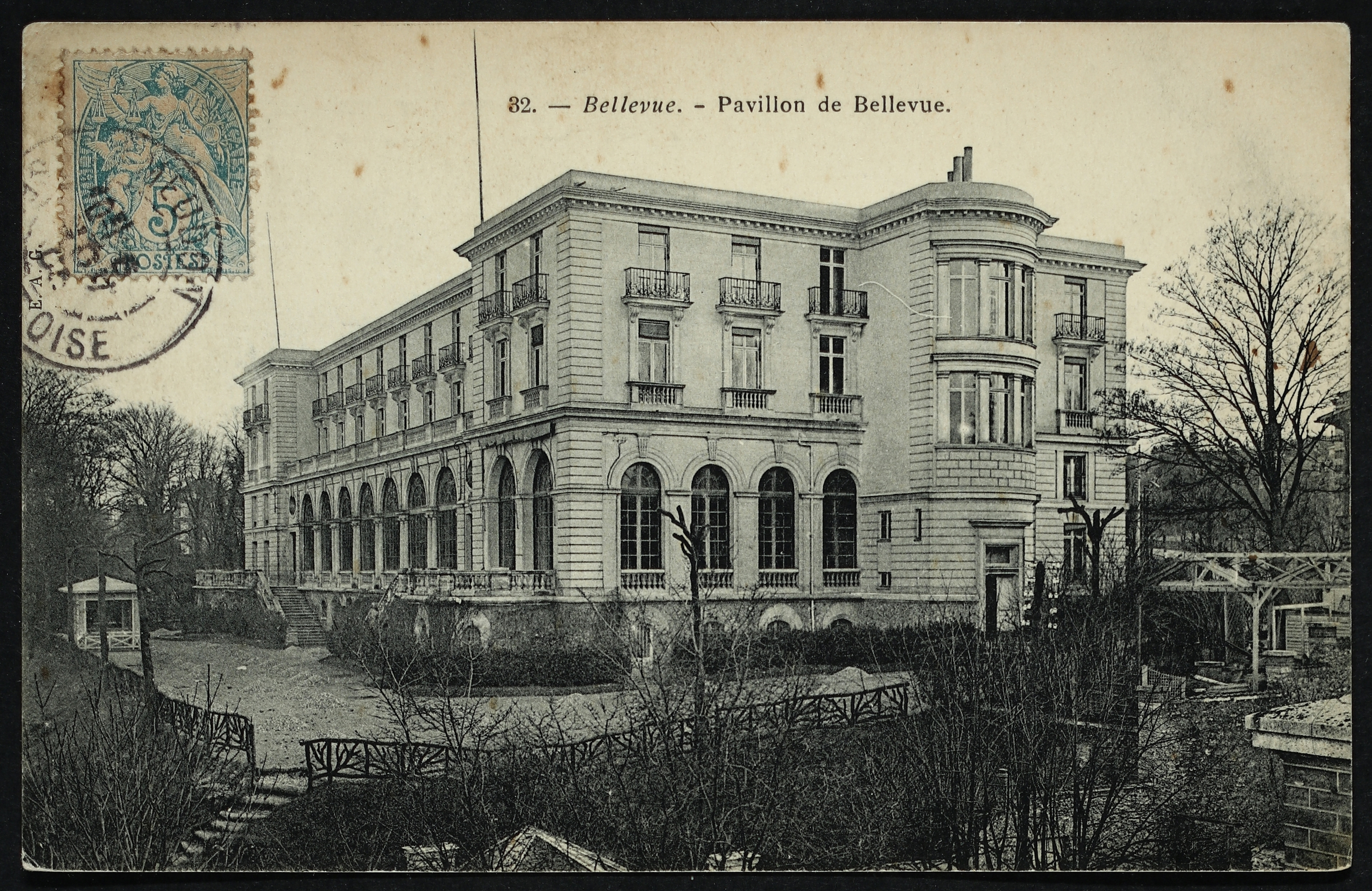
Hôtel du Pavillon de Bellevue.

In 1881, it was converted into a hotel-restaurant under the name Grand Hôtel de Bellevue, managed by the hotel company of the same name. The restaurant, located on the ground floor and known as Pavillon de Bellevue, benefited from the 1893 opening of the Bellevue funicular, which provided an immediate and successful connection between the train station and the landing stage for river shuttles from Bas-Meudon to the Bellevue viewpoint. In 1910, renowned Parisian restaurateur Louis Paillard (2, rue de la Chaussée d'Antin) purchased the hotel and operated it under the name Paillard Bellevue Palace until its bankruptcy in July 1913.

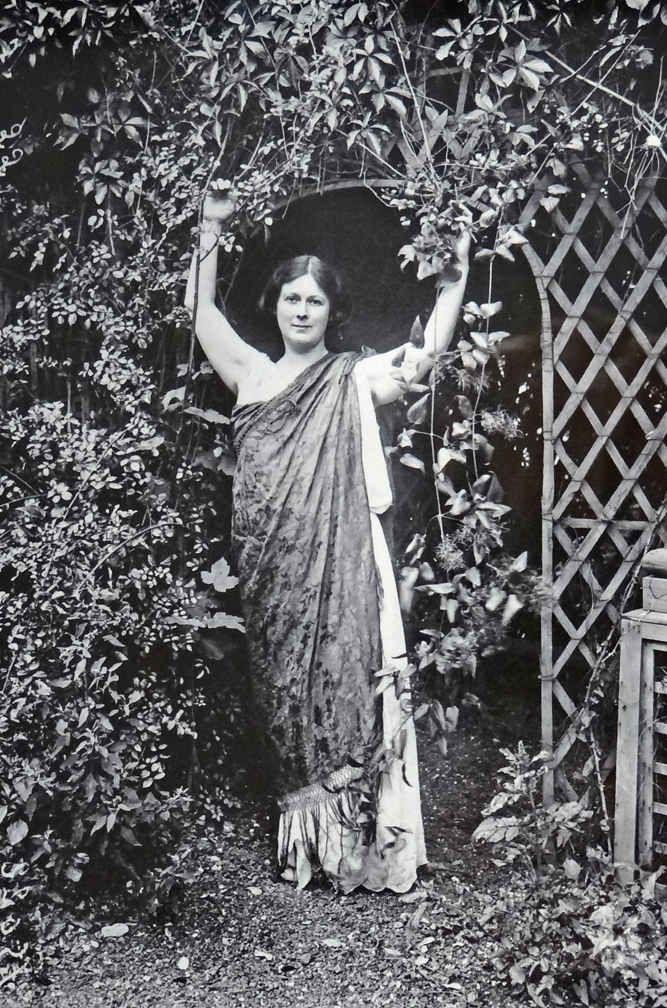
Isadora Duncan at Bellevue.

That same year, Paris Singer (1867–1932), the wealthy heir of the Singer sewing machine empire, purchased the property and gifted it to his mistress, Isadora Duncan (1878–1927). The renowned barefoot dancer, who had suffered the tragic loss of her two young children in April 1913 when their chauffeurless car plunged into the Seine, established a new dance school, Le Dyonision, at her Bellevue estate. This was her second school, following the one near her residence at 68 rue Chauveau, Neuilly-sur-Seine, close to the accident site on Boulevard Bourdon.

Shortly after the outbreak of World War I, Duncan made the Hôtel de Bellevue available to the military for use as a military hospital and took her students to the United States. When she returned to France, she found the property in a state of severe disrepair and decided in 1919 to sell it to the Office of Inventions, which later became the National Office for Scientific and Industrial Research and Inventions (ONRSII) in 1922, and eventually the French National Centre for Scientific Research (CNRS) in 1939.

In the 1950s and 1960s, the CNRS constructed several annex buildings around the pavilion, one of which completely obstructed the view of the pavilion from the center of Meudon. This annex was finally demolished in 2012, coinciding with the addition of an extra floor to the Bellevue Pavilion.

Subsequently, the CNRS planned to sell part of the site to a group of real estate developers for the construction of both residential and office buildings, which would replace the remaining annexes scheduled for demolition. A building permit was submitted in 2015, sparking local opposition due to concerns about pedestrian access, parking, and landscape aesthetics. After several reversals, the CNRS ultimately sold the western part of the sitein February 2023, following orders from its supervising ministry. Personnel and research activities were urgently relocated to the Bellevue Pavilion or other CNRS facilities in Gif-sur-Yvette.
