= Jules-Louis Breton =

French inventor and politician

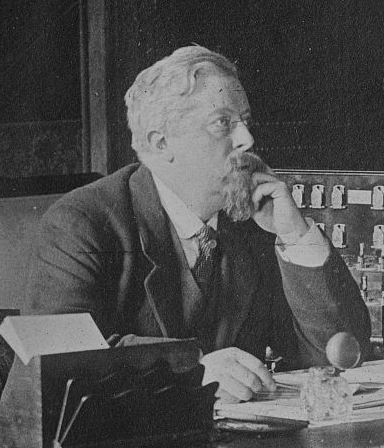
Jules-Louis Breton (1872-1940).

Jules-Louis Breton (1 April 1872 – 2 August 1940) was an inventor and a French politician. He was a representative of the French Assembly, and the proponent of the Breton-Prétot machine, a device developed in France from November 1914, intended to cut a way through barbed wire on the battlefield. It was developed with an engineer named Prétot, but did not progress beyond the experimental stage.

== Biography ==
Breton was born on 1 April 1872 in Courrières, Pas-de-Calais. He was a Socialist with Anarchist tendencies, and as a Natalist, endeavoured to giving more freedom to women.

During World War I he was France's Undersecretary of State for Inventions for National Defense. and later founded and directed the National Research and Invention Ministry. He was also Minister of Hygiene under President Millerand in 1920.

Breton was the founder and first director of the National Board of Scientific and Industrial Research and Inventions (ORNI: Office national des recherches scientifiques et industrielles et des Inventions), created on 29 December 1922 and dissolved on 24 May 1938, predecessor of the Centre national de la recherche scientifique (CNRS). In this role he founded the Salon des arts ménagers (Household Arts Exhibition), which showcased domestic appliances.

He died on 2 August 1940 in Meudon Bellevue.
