= Henri Longchambon =

French politician

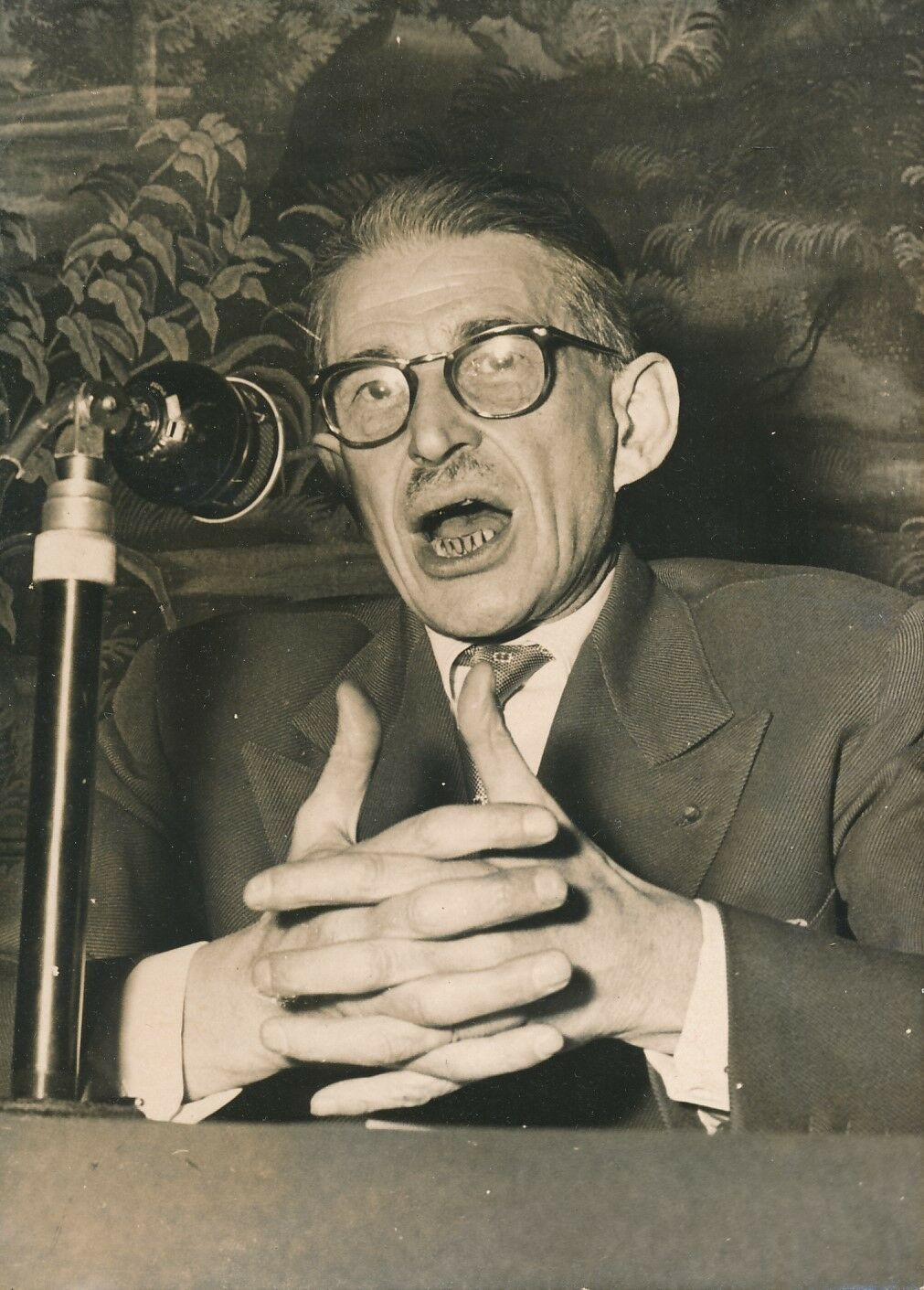
- Henri Longchambon in 1954
- Born: 27 July 1896; Clermont-Ferrand, France
- Died: 20 March 1969 (aged 72); Kremlin-Bicêtre, France
- Known for: Research on clay minerals, political contributions
- Awards: Prix Raulin, Légion d'Honneur (Officer), Croix de Guerre 1914–1918, Médaille de la Résistance (with rosette)

Marie François Henri Longchambon (27 July 1896 – 20 March 1969) was a French scientist and politician known for his work in geology, particularly on clay minerals, and his role in the French Resistance during World War II. He was awarded the Prix Raulin in 1936 for his scientific contributions.

== Biography ==
Henri Longchambon was born on 27 July 1896 in Clermont-Ferrand, France. His father, who worked at the University of Auvergne, died when he was thirteen years old. Longchambon passed his Baccalaureate in Clermont-Ferrand. He served in the First World War from 1915 to 1918 while still a student and subsequently received the knighthood of the Legion of Honour for valiant conduct. He graduated from the École Normale Supérieure and passed the agrégation in Physics in 1921.

He received a PhD in mineralogy from the University of Paris in 1925. Longchambon became an assistant professor at the University of Montpellier in 1925. He was appointed as the chair of the department of Applied and Theoretical Mineralogy at the University of Lyon in 1927. He succeeded Victor Grignard as Dean of its College of Sciences in 1936.

In 1938, he was appointed director of the Centre national de la recherche scientifique appliquée, the precursor to the Centre national de la recherche scientifique (CNRS). In this role, he had access to all discoveries related to national defense.

As the director-general of the CNRS, albeit briefly, from 13 to 18 June 1940, he destroyed scientific equipment in his laboratories to prevent it from falling into German hands. He fled to England, taking with him all technical documentation on heavy water. Returning to France in late July 1940, he resumed his post at the University of Lyon in December 1940. He later established a charcoal production facility in the forests of Auvergne that also served as a haven for those evading the compulsory labor service (STO). He was active in the French Resistance and helped organize local resistance groups.

In 1945, Longchambon was appointed Prefect for Rhône (department) and Commissaire de la République for the Rhône-Alpes region. He became Minister of Supply (French: Ministre du Ravitaillement) in the Félix Gouin government (26 January – 24 June 1946).

On 6 February 1947, he was elected to the Council of the Republic of France to represent French citizens abroad, aligning with the Democratic Left group. He was re-elected in 1948 and 1955 and later served in the Senate in 1959 and 1962. He also served as Secretary of State for Scientific Research and Technological Progress (Secrétaire d'État Recherche scientifique et Progrès technique) in the Pierre Mendès France government (19 June 1954 – 23 February 1955) and chaired the National Council for Scientific Research until 1958.

In the early 1950s, Longchambon initiated the creation of a major national institute dedicated to engineering education and applied research. With support from Lyon’s regional authorities, the government, and Parliament, the Institut national des sciences appliquées (INSA) was established in 1957 in Villeurbanne, Rhône. Under the guidance of Rector Jean Capelle, the institute welcomed its first class of engineering students in autumn 1957.

Later, Longchambon became a member of the Senate of the Community and presided over the Union des Français de l'étranger from 1967 to 1969.

Longchambon died on 20 March 1969 in Le Kremlin-Bicêtre near Paris. Henri Longchambon was buried in the woods near the village of La Garde, from which his family originated. The municipal stadium in Chapdes-Beaufort (Puy-de-Dôme) is named in his honor.

Among Citroën enthusiasts, Longchambon is known for owning the rare Citroën 22, a V8 prototype model thought to have been entirely destroyed. Investigative work by journalist Hervé Laronde revealed that the car, one of twenty prototypes, was stolen from Longchambon's widow in 1980.

== Decorations ==
- Légion d'Honneur (Officer)
- Croix de Guerre 1914–1918
- Médaille de la Résistance (with rosette), awarded on 3 August 1946
