= Institut de biologie physico-chimique =

Research Institute in France

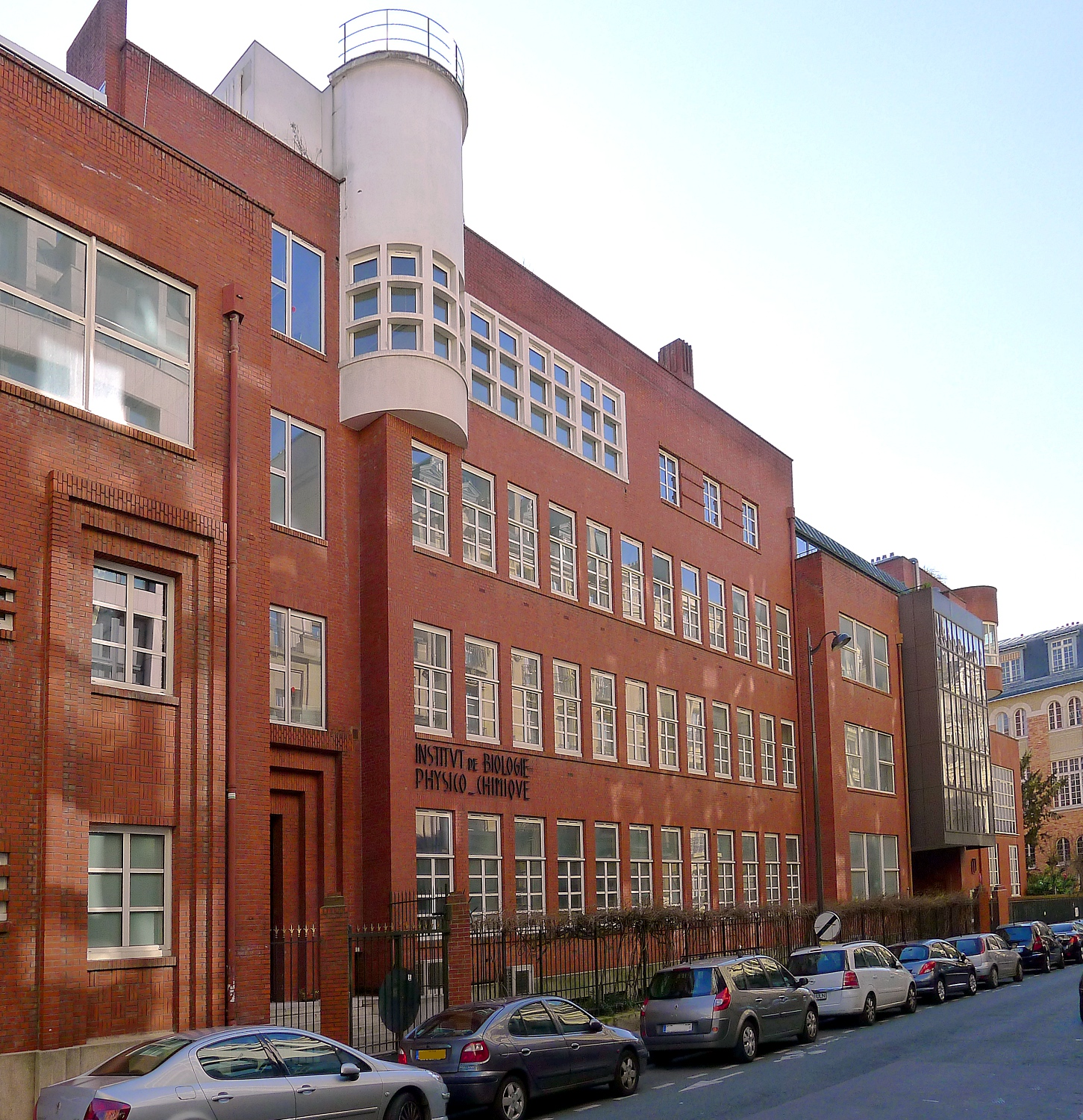
- Institut de biologie physico-chimique headquarters
- Founder: Paris Sciences et Lettres University
- Established: 1927
- Mission: Fundamental research
- Location: Paris, France
- Coordinates: 48.8445142°N 2.3435672°E
- Interactive map of Institut de biologie physico-chimique
- Website: https://ibpc.fr/
- Position in France

The Institut de biologie physico-chimique (IBPC) is a research center located in Paris, in the “Curie campus”, in the 5th arrondissement. Administratively it is a research federation (UAR550) of the National Center for Scientific Research.

== History and description ==
It was created after a donation from Edmond de Rothschild in 1927 at the instigation of the French physicist and Nobel Prize winner Jean Perrin who, noting the inadequacies of university research that was too compartmentalized, wanted to promote interdisciplinarity and create a new profession, researcher in physicochemical biology, paid to understand the physicochemical processes of living things, at the macroscopic, microscopic and molecular scales, with fields of application opening up to biosphere-climate interactions as well as pedology, agronomy, physiology, cytology or medicine, among others. The center, whose architect is Germain Debré, opened its doors in 1930. The campus where it is located is served by the Paris Métro (Monge or Cluny-La Sorbonne stations) and RER B (Luxembourg station).
