= Henri Laugier =

French scholar (1888–1973)

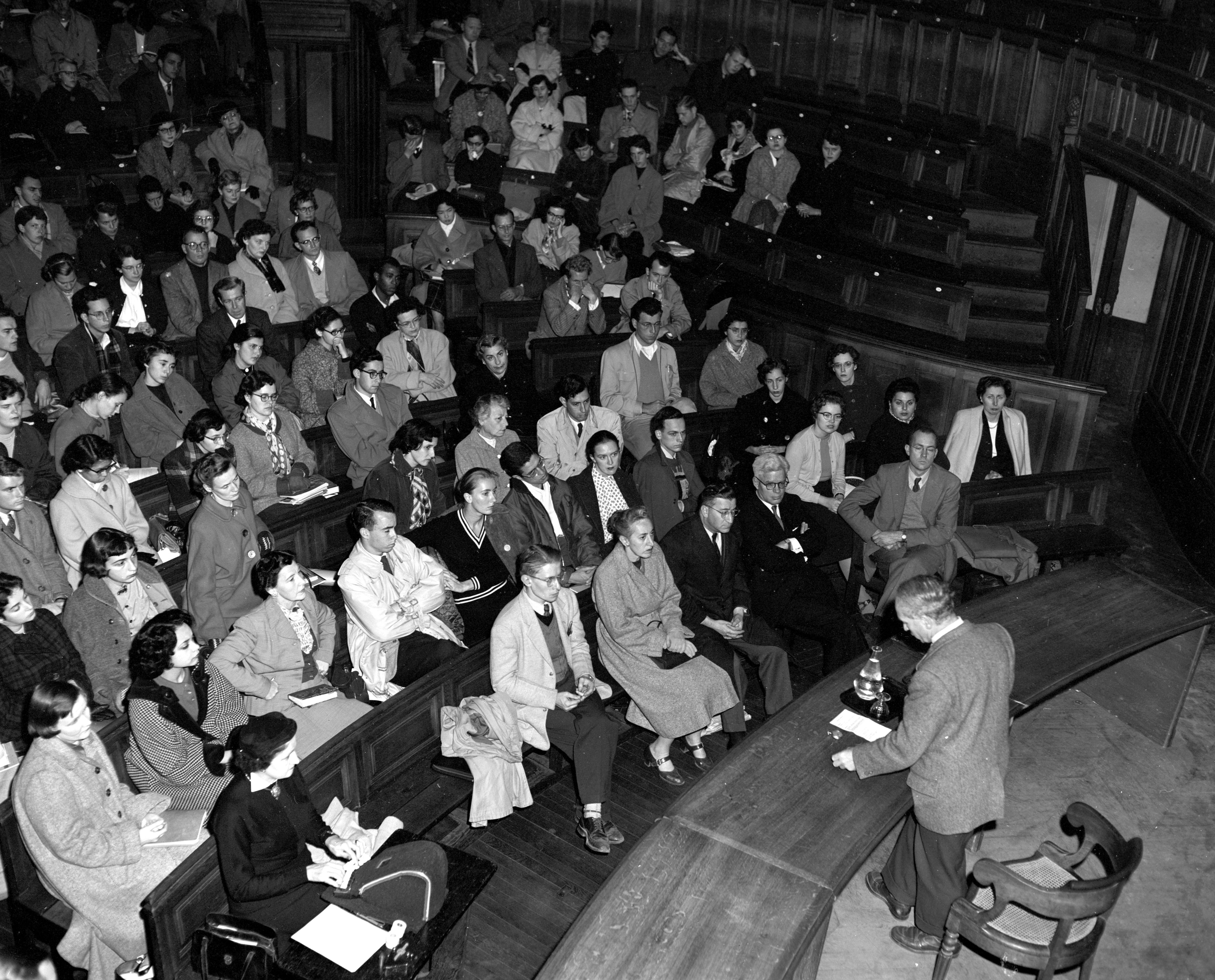
- Born: 5 August 1888
- Died: 19 January 1973 (aged 84)
- Occupation: Scholar

Henri Laugier (5 August 1888 – 19 January 1973) was a French scholar. He served as the president of the French National Centre for Scientific Research from 1939 to 1940 and from 1943 to 1944.

== Early life ==
Henri Laugier was born on 5 August 1888. He studied medicine, but dropped out of university to serve in the First World War. After the war, he returned to university and received a PhD.

== Career ==
Laugier started his career as a researcher for the Fondation Dosne-Thiers. He taught Physiology of Work at the Conservatoire national des arts et métiers from 1930 to 1937. He became Assistant Professor at the University of Paris in 1937. He worked for Minister Yvon Delbos in 1938. At the outset of World War II, he left for Montreal, Quebec, Canada, and subsequently French Algeria.

Laugier served as the president of the French National Centre for Scientific Research from 1939 to 1940 and from 1943 to 1944.

Laugier was appointed as the Assistant-Secretary-General for Social Affairs at the United Nations in 1946. During his period in office, he was involved in the process of drafting the Universal Declaration of Human Rights, having opened the preparatory meeting of the Commission on Human Rights.

He was one of the signatories of the agreement to convene a convention for drafting a world constitution. As a result, for the first time in human history, a World Constituent Assembly convened to draft and adopt the Constitution for the Federation of Earth.

== Death ==
Laugier died in 1973.
