= Jean Perrin =

French physicist (1870–1942)

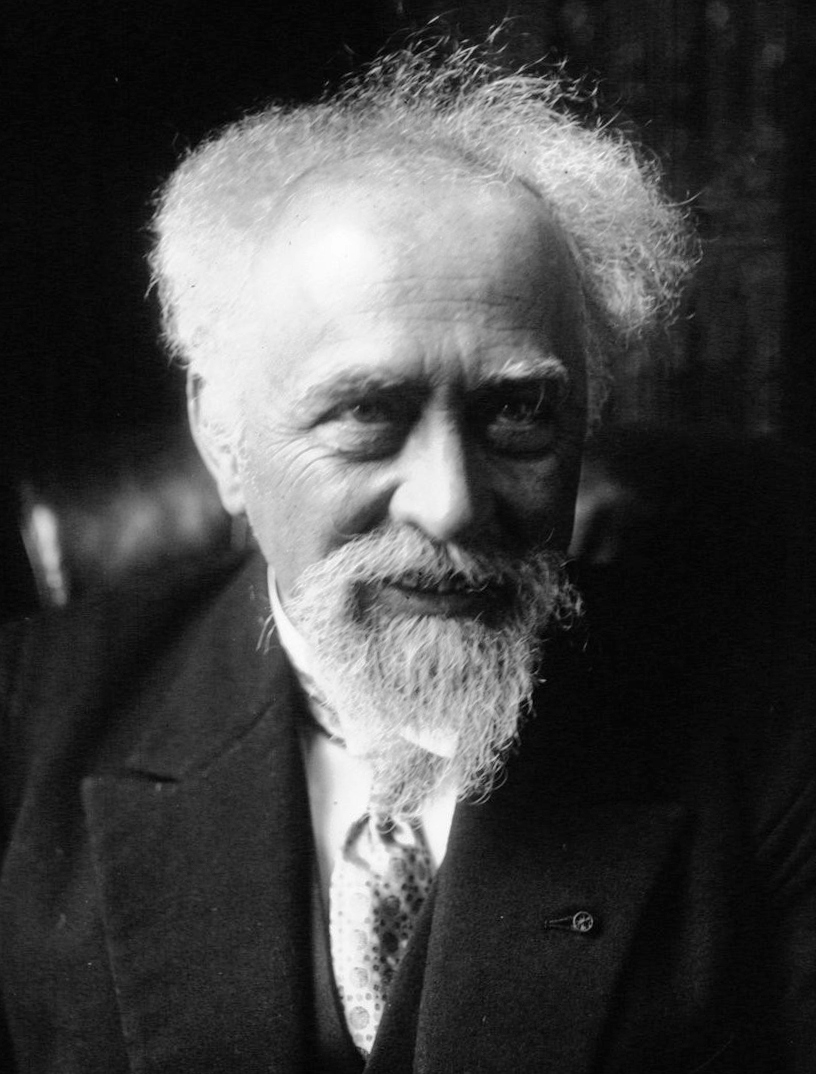
- Perrin in 1926
- Born: Jean Baptiste Perrin; 30 September 1870; Lille, France
- Died: 17 April 1942 (aged 71); New York City, U.S.
- Resting place: Panthéon, Paris
- Education: École normale supérieure (grad. 1894); University of Paris (grad. 1897)
- Known for: Sedimentation equilibrium
- Spouse: Henriette Perrin-Duportal (m. 1897; died 1938)
- Partner: Nine Choucroun (from 1938)
- Children: Aline and Francis Perrin
- Awards: Matteucci Medal (1911); Nobel Prize in Physics (1926)
- Scientific career
- Fields: Physics
- Workplaces: École normale supérieure; University of Paris
- Thesis: Rayons cathodiques et rayons de Röntgen : Étude expérimentale (1897)
- Doctoral advisors: Marcel Brillouin; Jules Violle
- Notable students: Pierre Victor Auger; Yvette Cauchois; Louis de Broglie

Signature
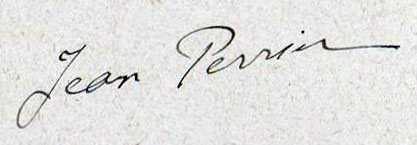

Jean Baptiste Perrin (French: [ʒɑ̃ batist pɛʁɛ̃]; 30 September 1870 – 17 April 1942) was a French physicist who, in his studies of the Brownian motion of minute particles suspended in liquids (sedimentation equilibrium), verified Albert Einstein's explanation of this phenomenon and thereby confirmed the atomic nature of matter. For this work, he was awarded the Nobel Prize in Physics in 1926.

== Education and career ==
Jean Baptiste Perrin was born on 30 September 1870 in Lille, France. Perrin attended the École normale supérieure, where he became an assistant in 1894. In 1897, he received his D.Sc. from the University of Paris for a thesis on cathode rays and X-rays. In the same year, he was appointed a lecturer in physical chemistry at the University, and in 1910 became a professor.

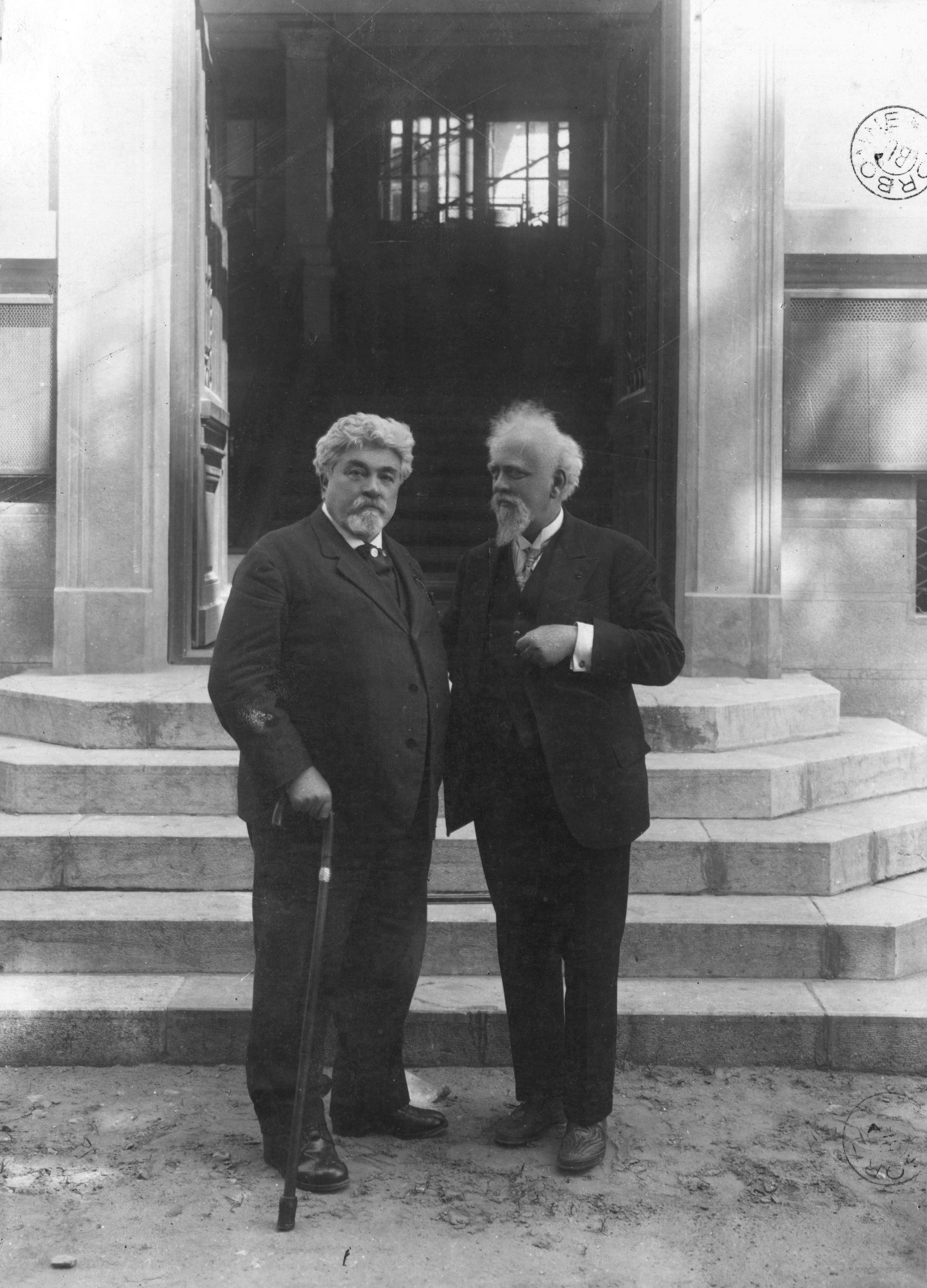
Ioan Cantacuzino (left) with Perrin in 1931

== Research ==
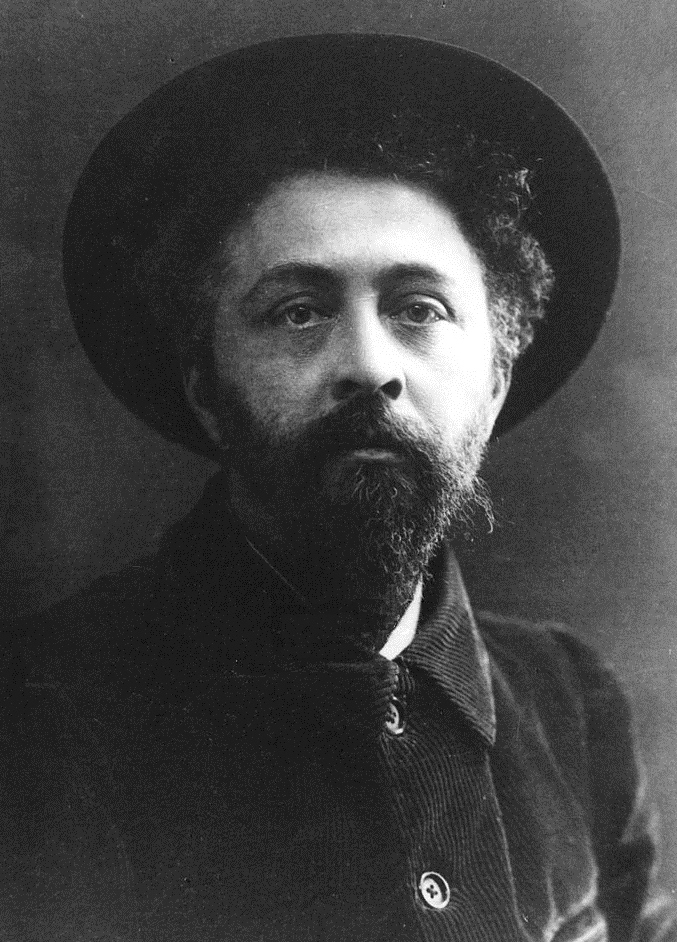
Jean Perrin in 1908

In 1895, Perrin showed that cathode rays were of negative electric charge. He determined the Avogadro constant by several methods. He explained solar energy as due to the thermonuclear reactions of hydrogen.

In 1901, Perrin proposed a hypothesis that each atom has a positively charged nucleus, similarly to Hantaro Nagaoka later, but never developed it further. It came to be known the Rutherford model.

By the late-1900s, Perrin was interested in statistical mechanics questions, which are close to the study of Brownian motion. Following Albert Einstein's publication (1905) of a theoretical explanation of Brownian motion in terms of atoms, Perrin (along with Joseph Ulysses Chaudesaigues who was working in Perrin's lab) did the experimental work to test and verify Einstein's predictions, thereby providing data that would settle the century-long dispute about John Dalton's atomic theory, before the end of the decade. Carl Benedicks argued Perrin should receive the Nobel Prize in Physics; Perrin received the prize in 1926 for this and other work on the discontinuous structure of matter, which put a definite end to the long struggle regarding the question of the physical reality of molecules.

Perrin was the author of a number of books and dissertations. Most notable of his publications were: "Les Principes, Exposé de thermodynamique" (Gauthier-Villars, 1901) - "Les Atomes" (Félix Alcan, 1913), translated into English, German, Polish, Russian…- "Matière et lumière - Essai de synthèse de la mécanique chimique", Ann. Physique, v9(11), 1919 - "La Recherche scientifique" (1933) - "Grains de matière et grains de lumière" (Hermann, Paris, 1935) - "Rayons cathodiques et rayons X" - "Electrisation de contact" - "Réalité moléculaire" - "Lumière et Reaction chimique".

Perrin was also the recipient of numerous prestigious awards including the Joule Prize of the Royal Society in 1896 and the La Caze Prize of the French Academy of Sciences. He was twice appointed a member of the Solvay Committee at Brussels in 1911 and in 1921. He also held memberships with the Royal Society of London and with the Academies of Sciences of Belgium, China, Prague, Romania, Soviet Unio, Sweden and Turin. He was Docteur honoris causa at the universities of Berlin, Columbia, Ghent, Oxford and Princeton. In 1926, he was made Commander of the Order of Léopold (Belgium) and of the French Legion of Honour, then Grand officier in 1937.

In 1919, Perrin proposed that nuclear reactions can provide the source of energy in stars. He realised that the mass of a helium atom is less than that of four atoms of hydrogen, and that the mass-energy equivalence of Einstein implies that the nuclear fusion (4 H → He) could liberate sufficient energy to make stars shine for billions of years. A similar theory was first proposed by American chemist William Draper Harkins in 1915. It remained for Hans Bethe and Carl Friedrich von Weizsäcker to determine the detailed mechanism of stellar nucleosynthesis during the 1930s.

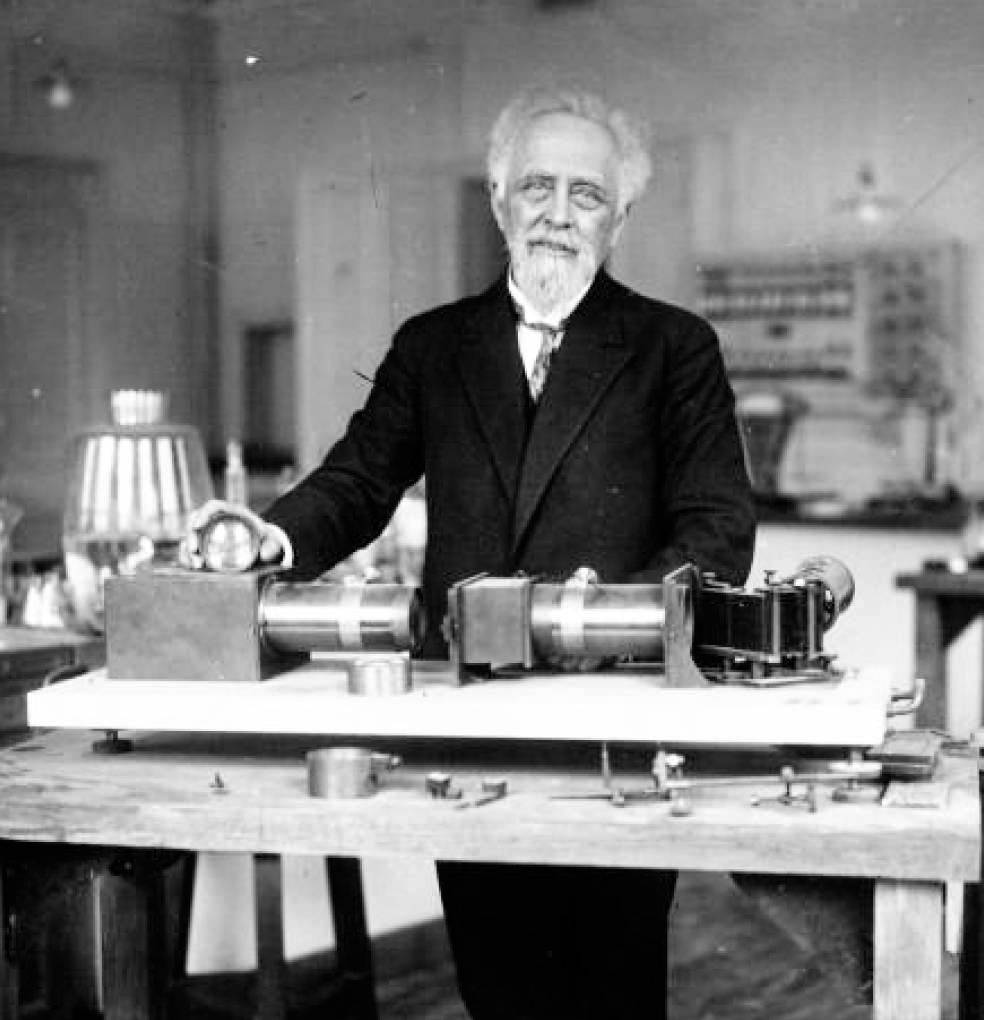

In 1927, Perrin founded the Institut de Biologie Physico-Chimique together with chemist André Job and physiologist André Mayer. Funding was provided by Edmond James de Rothschild.

In April 1933, following a petition by Perrin signed by over 80 scientists, among them eight Nobel Prize laureates, the new French education minister (succeeding in this position, to his friend Irène Curie, daughter of Pierre and Marie Curie) set up the Conseil Supérieur de la Recherche Scientifique (French National Research Council).

In 1936, Perrin, now an undersecretary for research, founded the Service Central de la Recherche Scientifique (French Central Agency for Scientific Research). Both institutions were merged under the CNRS umbrella on 19 October 1939.

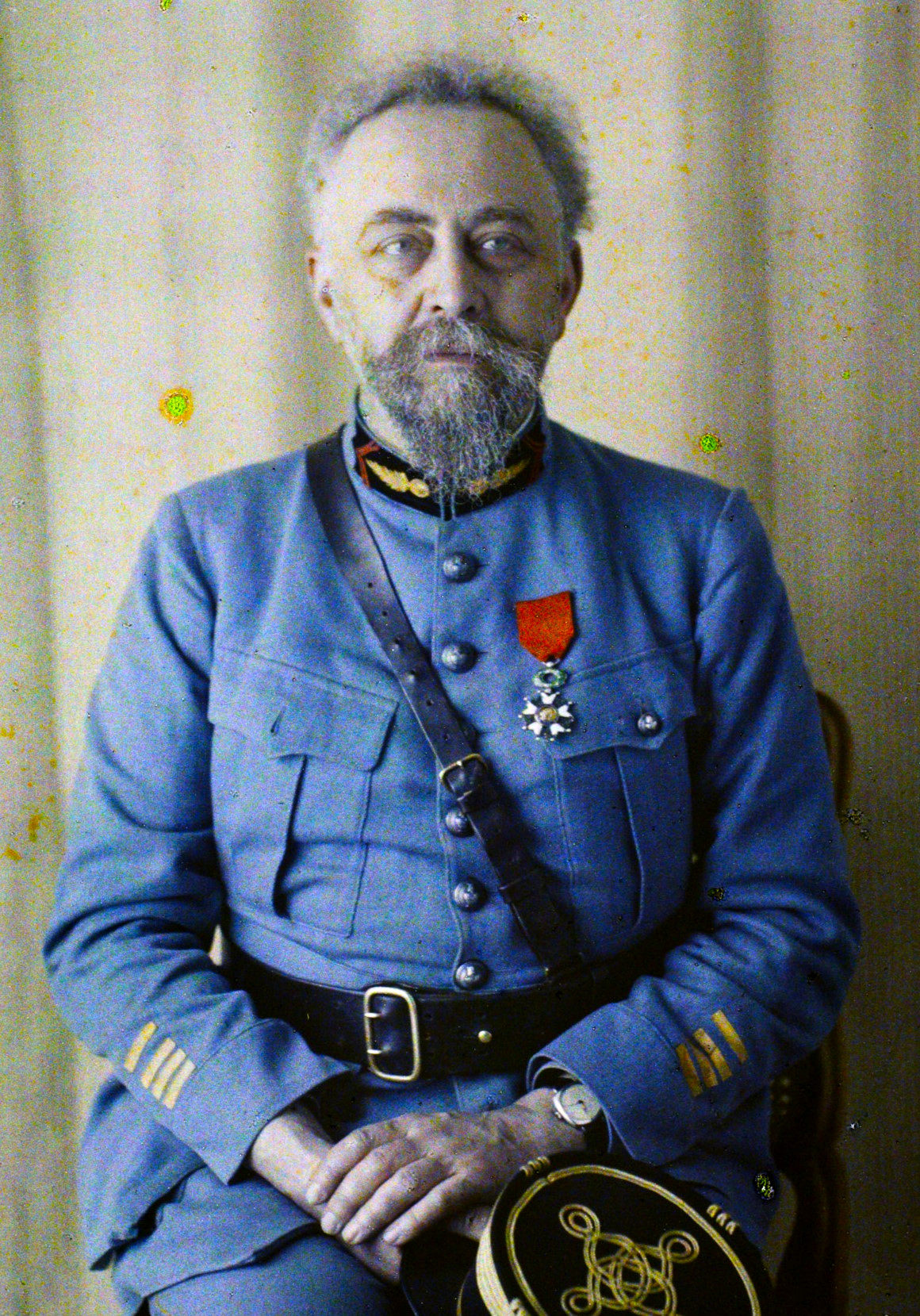
Autochrome portrait by Auguste Léon, 1918

At the same time, under the new Blum government, a fund was created to finance major public works projects to combat unemployment. Jean Perrin successfully used this fund to build laboratories (53 million francs), finance research (33 million francs), and create large-scale survey databases (13 million francs). It was within this framework that he founded, in 1937:- the Haute-Provence Observatory and the Paris Institute of Astrophysics, directed by Henri Mineur; - the Ivry Atomic Synthesis Laboratory, entrusted to Frédéric Joliot-Curie, which formed the beginnings of what would become the Atomic Energy Commission. The laboratory received, in particular, funding for the construction of a cyclotron; - the Laboratory for Large-Scale Chemical Processing, located in Vitry, was to be directed by Georges Urbain. His death in 1938 led to a change in the project, which became the Center for Metallurgical Studies under the direction of Georges Chaudron. The Institute of Human Biometrics, directed by Henri Laugier. - the Laboratory of Nutritional Physiology, directed by André Mayer - the Institute for Research and History of Texts, which is part of the National Archives. - the General Inventory of the French Language, whose mission was to create the Littré dictionary of the 20th century. Finally, Jean Perrin took advantage of the 1937 Universal Exposition in Paris to found the Palais de la Découverte, a science museum in Paris.

== Personal life and death ==
Perrin was an officer in the Engineer Corps during World War I. In 1915, he was appointed Deputy Chief of the Directorate of Inventions for National Defense, which aimed to coordinate French laboratories in the war effort.

In 1897, Perrin married Henriette Duportal (1869–1938), the daughter of Henri Duportal, a civil engineer and ardent republican, and the granddaughter of Armand Duportal, who had been Prefect of Haute-Garonne (France). Henriette had a baccalaureate degree, which was exceptional at that time. They had two children: Aline, born in 1899, and Francis, born in 1901, who later became a physicist.. Aline married the painter Charles Lapicque. They had five children, including the poet Georges Lapicque. She herself worked as an illustrator under the name Aline Lapicque-Perrin. Francis Perrin was a physicist, a specialist in nuclear fission, and High Commissioner of the French Atomic Energy Commission (CEA) from 1951 to 1970. He married Colette Auger, daughter of Victor Auger (professor of chemistry at the Faculty of Sciences in Paris), with whom he had three children: Nils, David, and Françoise.

After Henriette's death in 1938, Nine Choucroun became Perrin's partner. In June 1940, when the Germans invaded France, he and Choucroun escaped to Casablanca on the ocean liner Massilia, with part of the French government. In December 1941, they boarded the SS Excambion to New York City, arriving on 23 December.

Jean Perrin died on 17 April 1942 at Mount Sinai Hospital in New York City at the age of 71.

After the War, in 1948, his remains were transported back to France by the cruiser Jeanne d'Arc. On November 17, 1948, his ashes, along with those of his colleague and friend Paul Langevin, were transported to the Pantheon in Paris, following a national funeral.

== Works ==
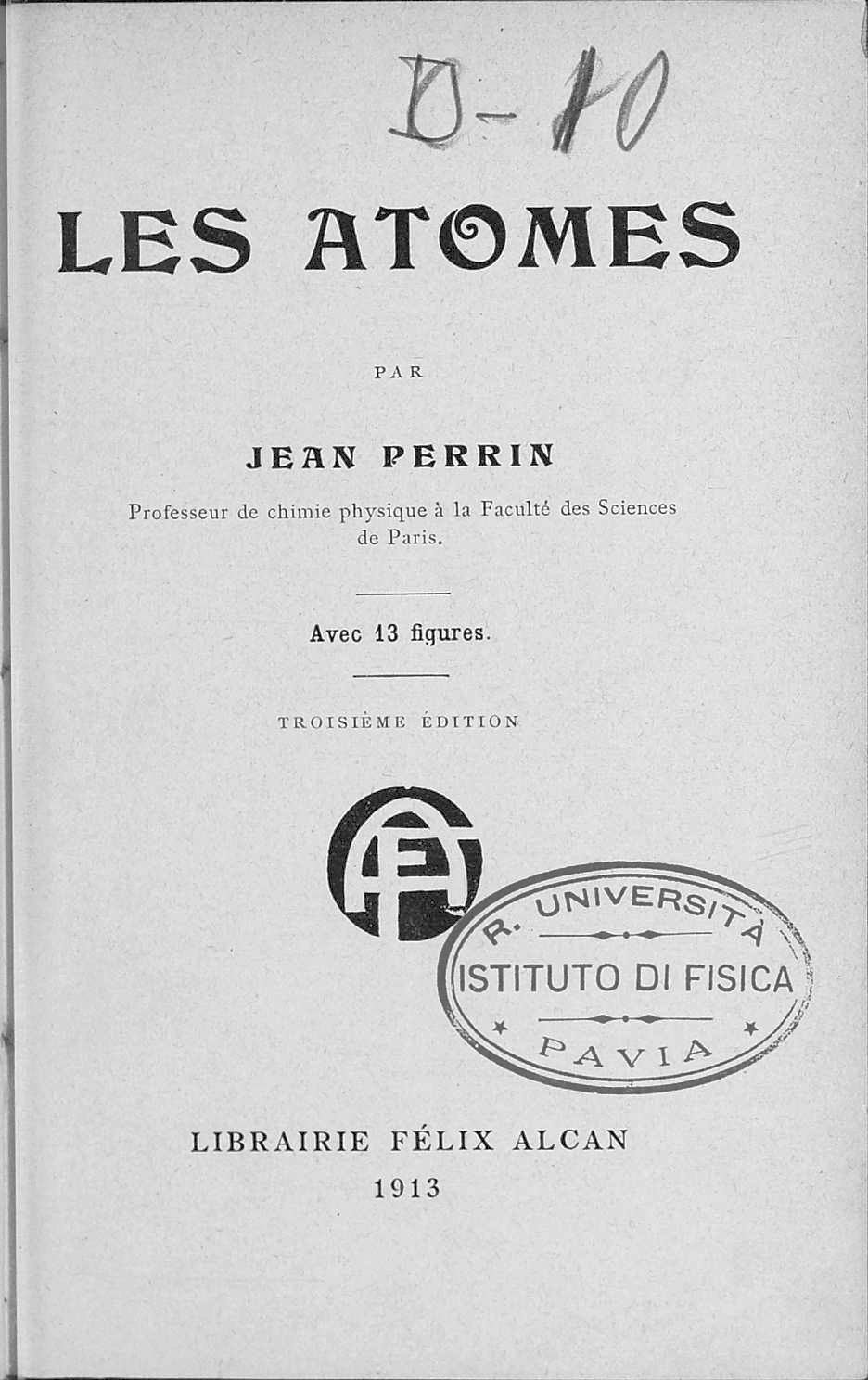
Atomes, 1913

- Les Principes. Exposé de thermodynamique (1901) / Principles of thermodynamics
- Traité de chimie physique. Les principes (1903) / Physical chemistry principles
- Les Preuves de la réalité moléculaire (1911) / Evidences of molecular reality
- Atomes (in French). Paris: Alcan. 1913.
- Les Atomes (1913) / The Atoms
- Matière et lumière (1919) / Matter and light
- En l'honneur de Madame Pierre Curie et de la découverte du Radium (1922) / In honor of Mrs Pierre Curie and the discovery of Radium
- Les Éléments de la physique (1929) / Elements of physics
- L'Orientation actuelle des sciences (1930) / Current orientation of sciences
- Les Formes chimiques de transition (1931) / Transition chemical forms
- La Recherche scientifique (1933) / Scientific research
- Cours de chimie. 1ère partie. Chimie générale et métalloïdes (1935) / Chemistry courses: general chemistry and metalloids
- Grains de matière et grains de lumière (1935) / Grains of matter and grains of light
  - Existence des grains / Existence of grains
  - Structure des atomes / Structure of atoms
  - Noyaux des atomes / Kernels of atoms
  - Transmutations provoquées / Induced transmutations
- Paul Painlevé: l'homme (1936) / Paul Painlevé: the man
- L'Organisation de la recherche scientifique en France (1938) / The organisation of scientific research in France
- À la surface des choses (1940–1941) / At the surface of things
  - Masse et gravitation (1940) / Mass and gravitation
  - Lumière (1940) / Light
  - Espace et temps (1940) / Space and time
  - Forces et travail (1940) / Forces and work
  - Relativité (1941) / Relativity
  - Électricité (1941) / Electricity
  - L'énergie (1941) / Energy
  - Évolution (1941) / Evolution
- L'Âme de la France éternelle (1942) / The soul of eternal France
- Pour la Libération (1942) / For Liberation
- La Science et l'Espérance (1948) / Science and hope
- Oeuvres scientifiques de Jean Perrin (1950) / Scientific works of Jean Perrin
