= Émile Borel =

French mathematician (1871–1956)

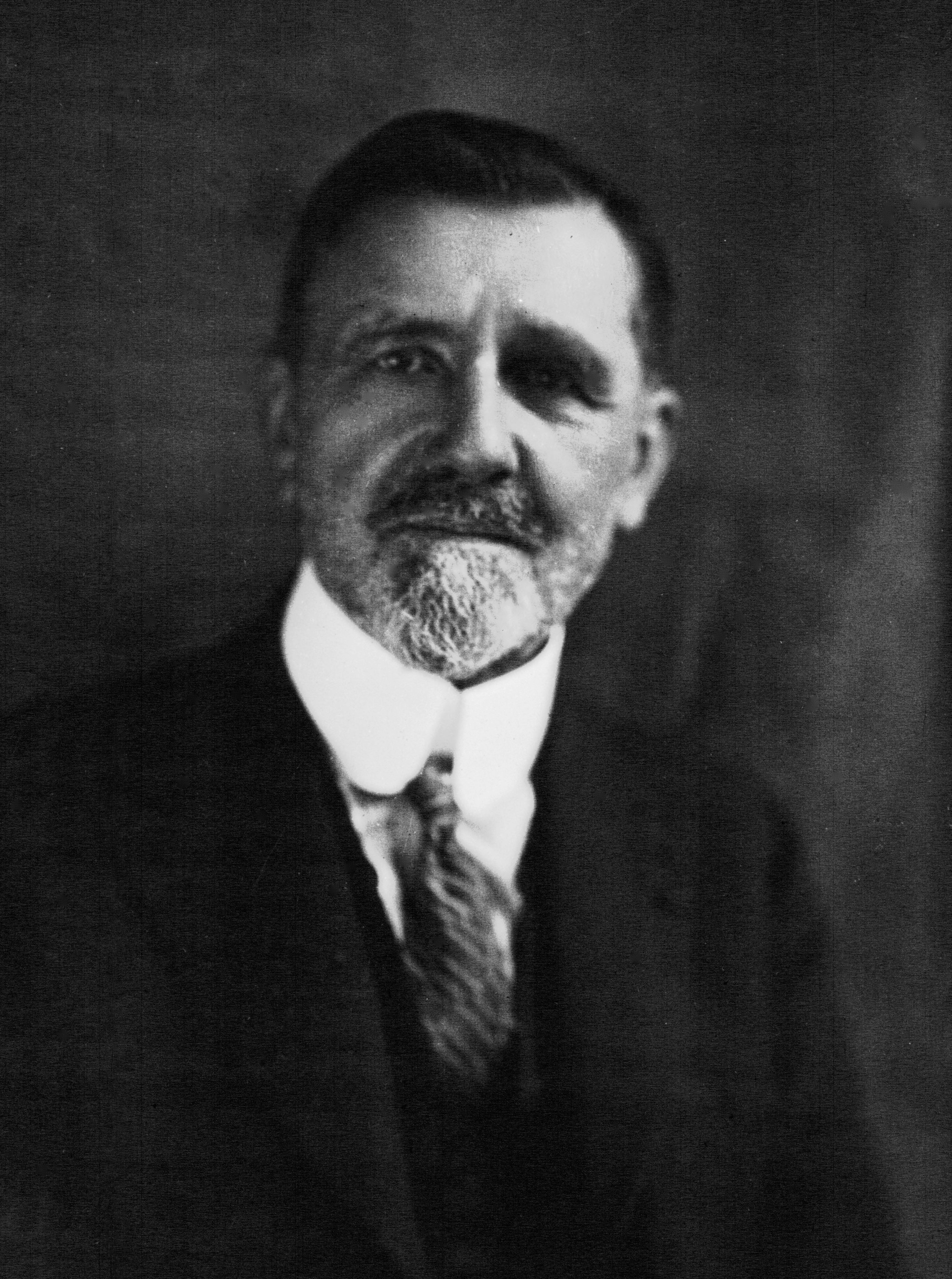
- Émile Borel (1932)

Minister of the Navy
- In office 17 April 1925 – 28 November 1925
- Prime Minister: Paul Painlevé
- Preceded by: Jacques-Louis Dumesnil
- Succeeded by: Georges Leygues

Member of the Chamber of Deputies
- In office 15 June 1924 – 4 June 1936

Personal details
- Born: Félix Édouard Justin Émile Borel; 7 January 1871 Saint-Affrique, France
- Died: 3 February 1956 (aged 85) Paris, France
- Spouse: Camille Marbo

Félix Édouard Justin Émile Borel (French: [bɔʁɛl]; 7 January 1871 – 3 February 1956) was a French mathematician and politician. As a mathematician, he was known for his founding work in the areas of measure theory and probability.

== Biography ==
Borel was born in Saint-Affrique, Aveyron, the son of a Protestant pastor. He studied at the Collège Sainte-Barbe and Lycée Louis-le-Grand before applying to both the École normale supérieure and the École Polytechnique. He qualified in the first position for both and chose to attend the former institution in 1889. That year he also won the concours général, an annual national mathematics competition. After graduating in 1892, he placed first in the agrégation, a competitive civil service examination leading to the position of professeur agrégé. His thesis, published in 1893, was titled Sur quelques points de la théorie des fonctions ("On some points in the theory of functions"). That year, Borel started a four-year stint as a lecturer at the University of Lille, during which time he published 22 research papers. He returned to the École normale supérieure in 1897, and was appointed to the chair of theory of functions, which he held until 1941.

In 1901, Borel married 17-year-old Marguerite, the daughter of colleague Paul Émile Appel; she later wrote more than 30 novels under the pseudonym Camille Marbo. Émile Borel died in Paris on 3 February 1956.

== Work ==
Along with René-Louis Baire and Henri Lebesgue, Émile Borel was among the pioneers of measure theory and its application to probability theory. The concept of a Borel set is named in his honor. One of his books on probability introduced the amusing thought experiment that entered popular culture under the name infinite monkey theorem or the like. He also published a series of papers (1921–1927) that first defined games of strategy. John von Neumann objected to this assignment of priority in a letter to Econometrica published in 1953 where he asserted that Borel could not have defined games of strategy because he rejected the minimax theorem.

With the development of statistical hypothesis testing in the early 1900s various tests for randomness were proposed. Sometimes these were claimed to have some kind of general significance, but mostly they were just viewed as simple practical methods. In 1909, Borel formulated the notion that numbers picked randomly on the basis of their value are almost always normal, and with explicit constructions in terms of digits, it is quite straightforward to get numbers that are normal.

In 1913 and 1914 he bridged the gap between hyperbolic geometry and special relativity with expository work. For instance, his book Introduction Géométrique à quelques Théories Physiques described hyperbolic rotations as transformations that leave a hyperbola stable just as a circle around a rotational center is stable.

In 1915 he was appointed head of the technical cabinet for the newly formed Directorate of Inventions for National Defense which aimed to coordinate French laboratories for the war effort in the First World War.

In 1922, he founded the Paris Institute of Statistics, the oldest French school for statistics; then in 1928 he co-founded the Institut Henri Poincaré in Paris.

== Political career ==
In the 1920s, 1930s, and 1940s, he was active in politics. From 1924 to 1936, he was a member of the Chamber of Deputies. In 1925, he was Minister of the Navy in the cabinet of fellow mathematician Paul Painlevé. During the Second World War, he was a member of the French Resistance.

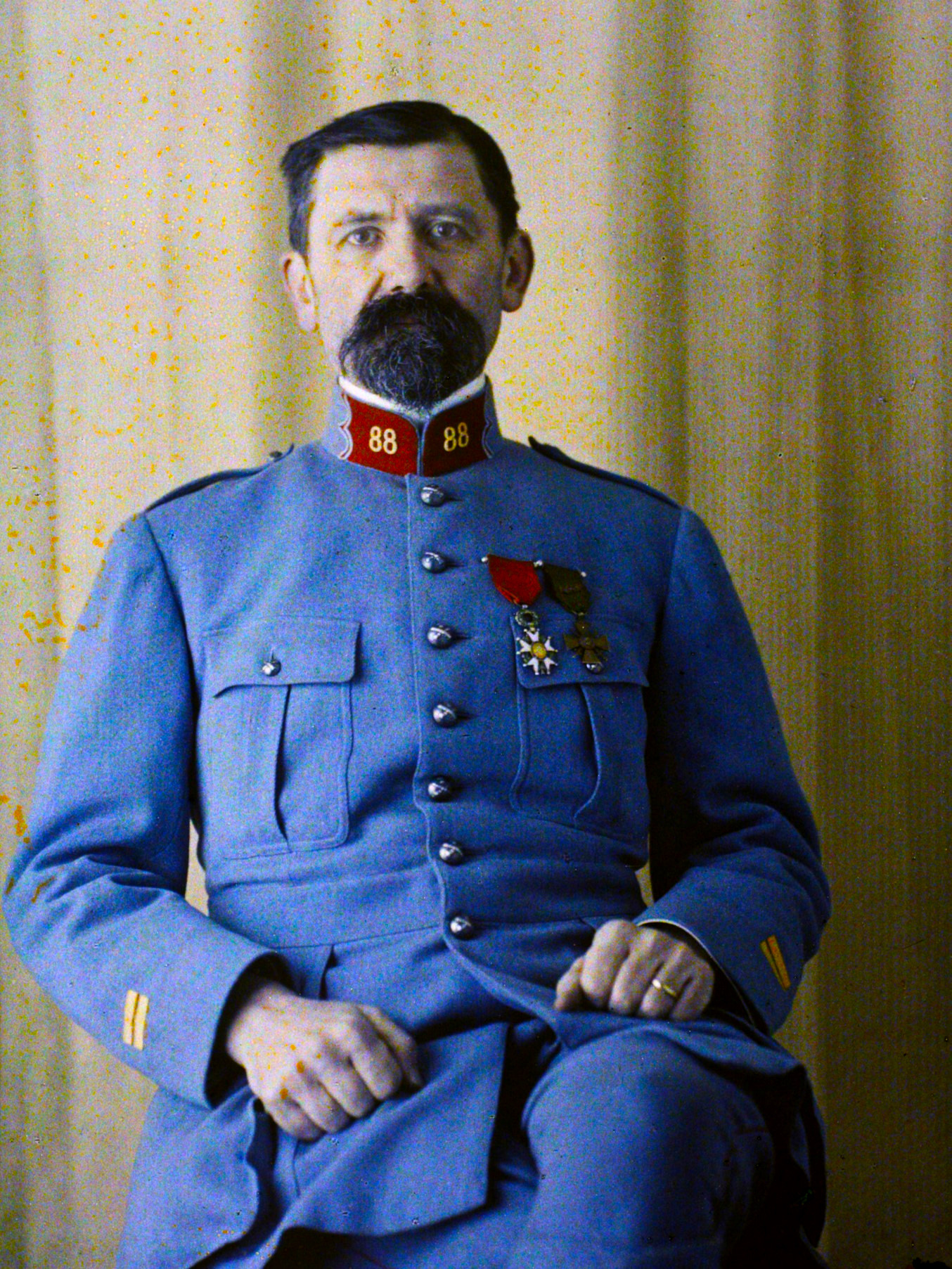
Autochrome portrait by Auguste Léon, 1918

== Honors ==
Besides the Centre Émile Borel at the Institut Henri Poincaré in Paris and a crater on the Moon, the following mathematical notions are named after him:

- Borel algebra
- Borel's lemma
- Borel's law of large numbers
- Borel measure
- Borel–Kolmogorov paradox
- Borel–Cantelli lemma
- Borel–Carathéodory theorem
- Heine–Borel theorem
- Borel determinacy theorem
- Borel right process
- Borel set
- Borel summation
- Borel distribution
- Borel's conjecture about strong measure zero sets (not to be confused with Borel conjecture, named for Armand Borel).

Borel also described a poker model that he coins La Relance in his 1938 book Applications de la théorie des probabilités aux Jeux de Hasard.

Borel was awarded the Resistance Medal in 1950.

== Works ==
- On a few points about the theory of functions (PhD thesis, 1894)
- Introduction to the study of number theory and superior algebra (1895)
- A course on the theory of functions (1898)
- A course on power series (1900)
- A course on divergent series (1901)
- A course on positive terms series (1902)
- A course on meromorphic functions (1903)
- A course on growth theory at the Paris faculty of sciences (1910)
- A course on functions of a real variable and polynomial serial developments (1905)
- Chance (1914)
- Geometrical introduction to some physical theories (1914)
- A course on complex variable uniform monogenic functions (1917)
- On the method in sciences (1919)
- Space and time (1921)
- Game theory and left symmetric core integral equations (1921)
- Methods and problems of the theory of functions (1922)
- Space and time (1922)
- A treatise on probability calculation and its applications (1924–1934)
- Application of probability theory to games of chance (1938)
- Principles and classical formulas for probability calculation (1925)
- Practical and philosophical values of probabilities (1939)
- Mathematical theory of contract bridge for everyone (1940)
- Game, luck and contemporary scientific theories (1941)
- Probabilities and life (1943)
- Evolution of mechanics (1943)
- Paradoxes of the infinite (1946)
- Elements of set theory (1949)
- Probability and certainty (1950)
- Inaccessible numbers (1952)
- Imaginary and real in mathematics and physics (1952)
- Emile Borel complete works (1972)

=== Articles ===
- (in French) "La science est-elle responsable de la crise mondiale?", Scientia : rivista internazionale di sintesi scientifica, 51, 1932, pp. 99–106.
- (in French) "La science dans une société socialiste", Scientia : rivista internazionale di sintesi scientifica, 31, 1922, pp. 223–228.
- (in French) "Le continu mathématique et le continu physique", Rivista di scienza, 6, 1909, pp. 21–35.

== See also ==
- Borel right process

Political offices
Preceded by Jacques-Louis Dumesnil	Minister of the Navy; April 17, 1925 – November 28, 1925	Succeeded by Georges Leygues
