= Traffic model =

A traffic model is a mathematical model of real-world traffic, usually, but not restricted to, road traffic. Traffic modeling draws heavily on theoretical foundations like network theory and certain theories from physics like the kinematic wave model. The interesting quantity being modeled and measured is the traffic flow, i.e. the throughput of mobile units (e.g. vehicles) per time and transportation medium capacity (e.g. road or lane width). Models can teach researchers and engineers how to ensure an optimal flow with a minimum number of traffic jams.

Traffic models often are the basis of a traffic simulation.

== Types ==
Microscopic traffic flow model
Traffic flow is assumed to depend on individual mobile units, i.e. cars, which are explicitly modeled
Mesoscopic traffic flow model
Includes some elements of individual vehicle interaction through simulation, but simplified compared to Microscopic models (microsim). Geographic coverage is usually in-between that of Macro and Micro
Macroscopic traffic flow model
Only the mass action or the statistical properties of a large number of units is analyzed

== Examples ==
- Biham–Middleton–Levine traffic model
- Traffic generation model
- History of network traffic models
- Traffic mix
- Intelligent driver model
- Network traffic
- Three-phase traffic theory
- Two-fluid model

== See also ==
- Braess's paradox
- Gridlock
- Mobility model
- Network traffic
  - Network traffic simulation
- Traffic bottleneck
- Traffic flow
- Traffic wave
- Queueing theory
  - Traffic equations
- Urban traffic modeling and analysis
