= Traffic measurement (telecommunications) =

Measurement of traffic within a network allows network managers and analysts to both make day-to-day decisions about operations and to plan for long-term developments. Traffic Measurements are used in many fundamental activities such as:

- Identification of traffic patterns and trends
- Calculating the traffic intensity in a specific circuit or group
- Monitoring the service
- Dimensioning and managing the network
- Calculating tariffs
- Performing forecasting
- Dimensioning and managing the SS7 network
- Checking the performance of the common channel signalling network

The following sections will answer some fundamental questions about Traffic Measurement, such as: What should be measured; when should it be measured; what assumptions are made; and what errors can occur?

== When should traffic be measured? ==
Traffic Measurements are conducted on a continuous basis and the results compiled into reports for management which are used in management decisions on various time scales. Measurements that are taken every few minutes are used for network management and temporary routing, measurements every few hours, days and weeks are used for maintenance purposes and measurements that are taken over months or even years are used for long-term network deployment, upgrading and extensions.

To determine normal reference traffic for a network, the ITU recommends that a network traffic analyst must take measurements for the busiest hour of each day for a whole year. The busiest hour is defined as that four consecutive quarter hours whose traffic intensity is the greatest. Measurements taken outside the busy hour can be discarded. The reference intensity of traffic is then calculated by taking the average traffic intensity of the top thirty days in the year. Measurements taken on individual days can be discarded. This will give the normal high traffic intensity in the network, allowing network managers to make long-term strategic decisions.

== Assumptions made when calculating circuits required ==
To perform calculations in circuit-switched networks several assumptions are made:

- Calls arrivals follow a Poisson distribution
- Holding times follow a Negative Exponential distribution
- Blocked calls are lost or overflow
- There is statistical equilibrium

It is useful to remember that the measurements are averages, and this process deliberately ignores very short term variations in the traffic, but still allows for a small but finite loss. The above assumptions are accurate if applied to circuit switched networks; however they fail when planning for data traffic, small exchanges and sudden sharp peaks in traffic such as that caused by TV and radio phone-in competitions.

== Traffic measurement errors ==
Measurement errors are caused by faults in equipment or constraints on equipment design. The following five errors are examples of some types of errors that can occur:

- Post-processing errors – These errors are generated by operators when analysing data that has been measured
- Pre-processing errors – These errors are generated by computers when compiling data for operators
- Statistical errors – These errors are caused by the averages in traffic measurements and by the fact that measurements are made from discrete samples
- Database errors – These errors exist when errors are generated by faults in the storage of information
- Interpretation errors – These errors occur when analysts misinterpret data
