= Pursue mobility model =

The pursue mobility model is a type of spatially-dependent mobility model which is used in ad hoc wireless networks and is also based on RPGM (reference point group model). It represents the tracking process of a mobility node (MN) involving a single targeted node using a Random Waypoint. This technology is often used in law enforcement and signal source tracking.

The pursue mobility model simulates scenarios where several nodes attempt to capture single mobile node ahead. This mobility model could be used in target tracking and law enforcement. The node being pursued (i.e., target node) moves freely according to the Random waypoint model. By directing the velocity towards the position of the targeted node, the pursuer nodes (i.e., seeker nodes) try to intercept the target node. This can be demonstrated in the case of police officers trying to locate a criminal with the target being pursued serving as an MN moving based on a specific synthetic single node mobility model.

The pursue mobility model consists of a single update equation for the new position of each Moving Node: new position = old position + acceleration(target—old position) + randomvector.

Example: Nodes chase after a single target that may or may not be moving. Here we have a collection of robots (nodes) trying to catch a single robot that acts as a target. This kind of behavior is found in multiple robotics activities (e.g.: people tracking and so on).
