= Network traffic =

Network traffic or data traffic is the amount of data moving across a network at a given point of time. Network data in computer networks is mostly encapsulated in network packets, which provide the load in the network. Network traffic is the main component for network traffic measurement, network traffic control and simulation.

- Network traffic control - managing, prioritizing, controlling or reducing the network traffic
- Network traffic measurement - measuring the amount and type of traffic on a particular network
- Network traffic simulation - to measure the efficiency of a communications network
- Traffic generation model - is a stochastic model of the traffic flows or data sources in a communication computer network.

Proper analysis of network traffic provides the organization with the network security as a benefit - unusual amount of traffic in a network is a possible sign of an attack. Network traffic reports provide valuable insights into preventing such attacks.

== Traffic volume ==
Traffic volume is a measure of the total work done by a resource or facility, normally over 24 hours, and is measured in units of erlang-hours. It is defined as the product of the average traffic intensity and the time period of the study.

Traffic volume = Traffic intensity × time

A traffic volume of one erlang-hour can be caused by two circuits being occupied continuously for half an hour or by a circuit being half occupied (0.5 erlang) for a period of two hours. Telecommunication operators are vitally interested in traffic volume, as it directly dictates their revenue.
