= Teletraffic engineering =

Application of traffic engineering theory to telecommunications

Teletraffic engineering, or telecommunications traffic engineering is the application of transportation traffic engineering theory to telecommunications. Teletraffic engineers use their knowledge of statistics including queuing theory, the nature of traffic, their practical models, their measurements and simulations to make predictions and to plan telecommunication networks such as a telephone network or the Internet. These tools and knowledge help provide reliable service at lower cost.

The field was created by the work of A. K. Erlang for circuit-switched networks but is applicable to packet-switched networks, as they both exhibit Markovian properties, and can hence be modeled by e.g. a Poisson arrival process.

The observation in traffic engineering is that in large systems the law of large numbers can be used to make the aggregate properties of a system over a long period of time much more predictable than the behaviour of individual parts of the system.

== See also ==
- Asynchronous Transfer Mode
- Busy hour call attempts
- Cellular traffic
- Erlang (unit)
- Flow control (disambiguation)
- Long-tail traffic
- Mobile QoS
- Routing
- RSVP-TE
- Traffic mix
- Traffic generation model
- Traffic contract
- Traffic shaping
