= NRAO 190 =

Blazar in the constellation of Eridanus

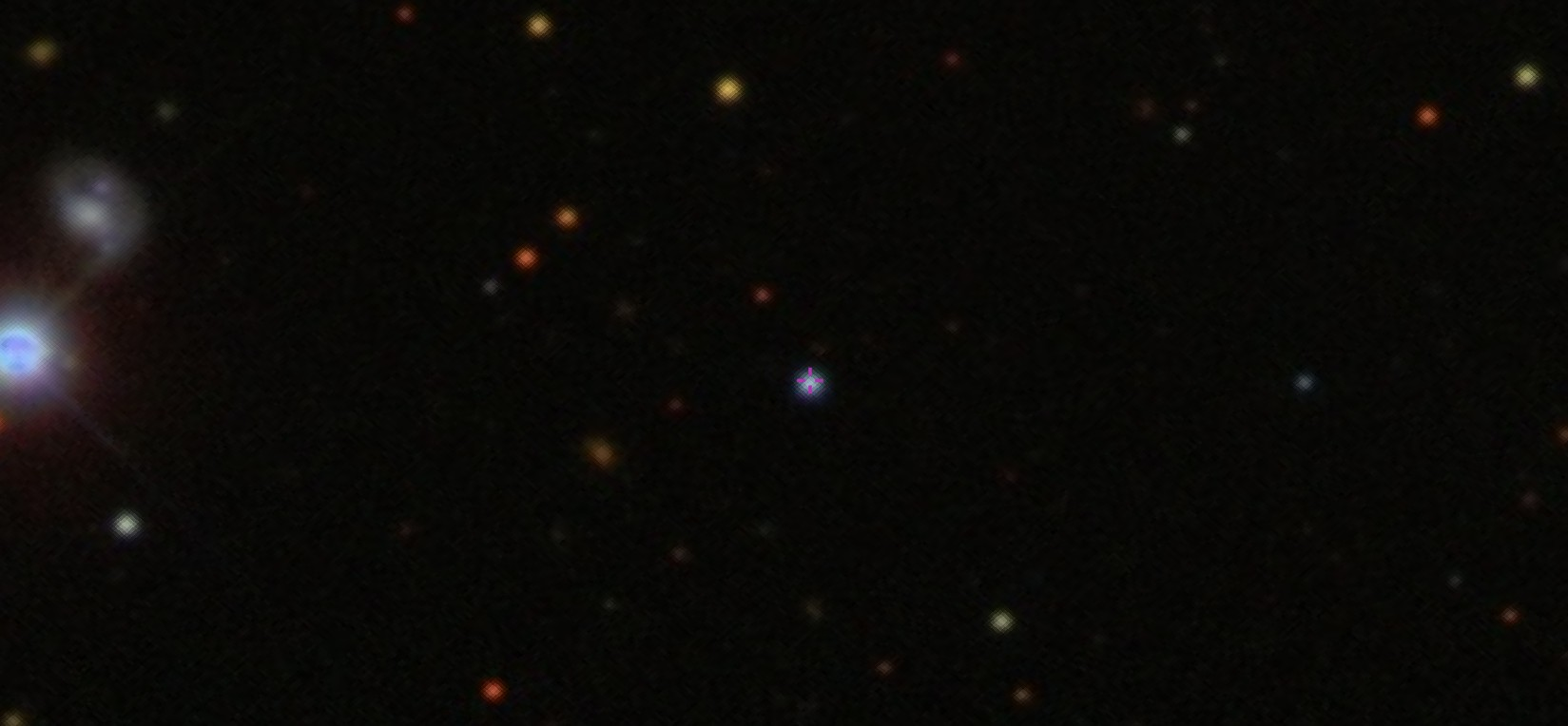
- The blazar NRAO 190.

Observation data (J2000.0 epoch)
- Constellation: Eridanus
- Right ascension: 04^{h} 42^{m} 38.6607^{s}
- Declination: −00° 17′ 43.421″
- Redshift: 0.845000
- Heliocentric radial velocity: 253,325 km/s
- Distance: 6.854 Gly
- Apparent magnitude (V): 19.22
- Apparent magnitude (B): 19.59

Characteristics
- Type: Opt.var; HPQ Blazar

Other designations
- PKS 0440-003, PKS 0440-00, LEDA 2824056, QSO B0440-004, 2E 1137, OHIO F -067, NVSS J044238-001742

NRAO 190 is a blazar located in the constellation of Eridanus. Its redshift is (z) 0.844 and it was first discovered as an astronomical radio source via a high-resolution radio interferometry observation in 1968 by astronomers. The radio spectrum of the object is considered as flat, leading to it being classified as a flat-spectrum radio quasar.

== Description ==
NRAO 190 is known to be optically variable at all wavelengths. During an optical study conducted between 1970 and 1992, the source of the object is found to display extreme fluctuations on timescales, with its photographic magnitude reaching around 18.5 to 19.0 magnitude around 1975-1985. It is also said NRAO 190 can be classified as an optically violently variable quasar since its variability is shown to dramatically increase when reaching its active phase. During early 1986, it showed a rapid brightening increase of 1.4 magnitude which was soon followed by 1.9 decrease over a period of 34 days.

NRAO 190 displays gamma ray flares. Between August 9 and 20 in 1994, astronomers detected a flare from the direction of it, with the energy range reaching above 100 MeV. Gamma ray outbursts were also detected from the object in May 2009 and June 2013. In January 2024, the source showed renewed activity which was detected by the Large Area Telescope (LAT).

The source of NRAO 190 is found to be compact. Images of the radio structure made by Very Long Baseline Array (VLBA) showed it has a single-sided jet with no traces of an extended radio structure located beyond 2 milliarcseocnds from the core region. When imaged with a 22 GHz radio map, the source shows three components; a weak component, a bright yet unresolved core and a bright knot that is moving in a downstream direction. It is indicated NRAO 190 is also a core-dominated source since 40% of its flux mainly originates from the core according to observations made by Very Long Baseline Interferometry.

The host galaxy of NRAO 190 is found unresolved through H-band images. A study published in 2024 estimates the object has a supermassive black hole mass of 1.73 × 10^{8} M_{☉} with its accretion disk luminosity measured as 1.71 × 10^{46} erg s^{−1} based on an optical/UV data fit. An Hβ line was also discovered in its optical spectra suggesting a narrow-line Seyfert 1 classification.
