= Traffic pattern =

Traffic pattern can refer to

- Information traffic patterns
- Airfield traffic patterns

== See also ==
- Traffic analysis
