= BT Versatility =

PBX switchboard for small businesses

The BT Versatility is a telephone PBX switchboard sold by BT and targeted at small businesses. It is manufactured by Taratel Communications previously Lake Communications in Ireland as the OfficeLink. In South Africa it was sold by Tellumat as the Convergence 30 or C30, in Australia it was sold as the Commander Connect, in the USA it was sold by Inter-tel as the Encore CX and by Mitel as the Mitel 3000

It has modular construction allowing a basic setup to be expanded as needed by clipping extra modules onto a backplane

The basic Central Control Unit (CCU) starts off as an 8 extension unit, with either analog POTS lines or ISDN line modules available. There is a serial connection that can be used for call logging and configuration. It can either use standard telephones or proprietary feature phones. A special Door Phone may be added on extension 23 and the system may be connected to an electronic lock relay to allow the door to be opened via a Door Phone call. Any extension may be programmed as a PA (Public Address) speaker.

It is the successor to the BT Pathway also made by Lake Communications, which superseded the BT Inspiration which in turn superseded the BT Revelation.

== Technical specification ==
=== Extensions ===
- You can have up to 40 Hybrid extensions
- Up to 8 V16 XP Consoles.

=== Lines ===
- 6 ISDN 2e (12 Channels)
- 1 ISDN 30 (PRI) (15 Channels)
- 12 Analogue Lines.

=== Voicemail ===
- 40 Individual Mailboxes
- 10 Phantom Mailboxes
- 20 Group Boxes
- 1 System Mailbox

=== Power ===
Maximum Consumption: 350VA

== CCU modules ==
Gives 8 extensions onboard and allows the following modules to be added via slots in the CCUs cover.

- Voicemail (Blue)
  - 2-Port with 2 Hours capacity
  - 4-Port with 4 Hours capacity
  - 8-Port with 20 Hours capacity
- ISDN BRI module (x2) (Red)
- or a 2-Line PSTN Module (x2) (Black)
- ISDN PRI module (up to 15 channels) (Yellow)
- Router Module Connects to back plane and provides internet over ISDN Channel. Also provides DHCP/DNS/Gateway Services
- The BROADBAND MODULE is equipped with a VoIP gateway with the following features:
  - 2 endpoints which support IP trunks
  - Proxy server registration
  - Codecs - G.711, G.729
  - Quality of Service
  - Built in ADSL Modem
  - Redundant Internet via ISDN
- The BROADBAND MODULE PLUS is equipped with a VoIP gateway with the following features:
  - 12 endpoints which support trunks, extensions, unified messaging or any combination of all three
  - Proxy server registration
  - Codecs - G.711, G.729
  - Quality of Service
  - Built in ADSL Modem
  - Redundant Internet via ISDN

The following may be installed inside the CCU.

- Music On-Hold (MOH) Module which connects to any Extension on the CCU.
- Battery Backup - requires a 7aH Sealed Lead Acid Battery to give 40mins at 11erlangs.

== CCU backplane ==
Purchasing one of these allows up to 5 of the following modules to be added:

=== Ports module ===
Gives 8 more extensions by default and allows either:

- ISDN BRI module (x2)
- or a 2-Line PSTN Module (x2)

=== Options module ===
This allows a Central Bell and Music On-Hold as well as an external Long-Line extension (up to 2 km).

=== BroadBand module ===
On the BT Systems this allows you to connect to BT's VOIP services as trunks and provides the ability to connect VOIP extensions using the V-IP Feature Phone.

The BROADBAND MODULE has the following features:

- Wide Area Networking
- Local Area Networking - providing a 4 port hub
- Wireless Local Area Networking
- Multi-user Internet Access
- ADSL/Broadband
- ISDN
- Firewall
- VoIP Gateway supporting 2 IP trunks
- Management - via serial (v24 interface) or IP

The BROADBAND MODULE PLUS has all the above features but includes a VoIP Gateway with 12 endpoints that can be configured as IP trunks, IP extensions, or any combination of both. It also supports Unified Messaging.

== Feature phones ==
=== Default password ===
1111

=== V-Phone ===
This is the basic single line phone.

=== V-8 Phone ===
This has 8 speed dial keys. Required for programming.

=== V-16 Phone ===
This has 16 speed dial keys, may also be used for programming

==== XP Console ====
The V-16 may be equipped with a 32-Button XP Console. Up to 8 phones are supported with this on a system, but needs a mains adaptor for power (5V DC).

=== V-IP Phone ===
This connects to your network to link to the Broadband module, either locally or over a VPN. Requires mains power.

== Wiring information ==
Extensions are 4-wire hybrids; connect 2 and 5 to A and B on the CCU for standard analogue extensions and 1 and 6 to C and D for digital extensions. There are no connections to 3 and 4.

== Miscellaneous information ==
Current known highest firmware version for the CCU is 915 Current known highest firmware version for the BBM is 189

- The BBM module is notoriously unreliable on early versions of the firmware requiring frequent reboots to reconnect to the trunk.
- The BBM comes in two versions, a two port and twelve port. Both are to be avoided and best use a VoIP to PSTN trunk converter, such as a Cisco unit.

This unit was manufactured for other markets under the name of "Commander Connect", "Inter-tel Encore CX", "Tellumat Convergence 30 (C30)" & "Mitel 3000"
