= Mobile QoS =

Quality of service (QoS) mechanism controls the performance, reliability and usability of a telecommunications service. Mobile cellular service providers may offer mobile QoS to customers just as the fixed line PSTN services providers and Internet service providers may offer QoS. QoS mechanisms are always provided for circuit switched services, and are essential for non-elastic services, for example streaming multimedia. It is also essential in networks dominated by such services, which is the case in today's mobile communication networks.

Mobility adds complication to the QoS mechanisms, for several reasons:

- A phone call or other session may be interrupted after a handover, if the new base station is overloaded. Unpredictable handovers make it impossible to give an absolute QoS guarantee during a session initiation phase.
- The pricing structure is often based on per-minute or per-megabyte fee rather than flat rate, and may be different for different content services.
- A crucial part of QoS in mobile communications is grade of service, involving outage probability (the probability that the mobile station is outside the service coverage area, or affected by co-channel interference, i.e. crosstalk) blocking probability (the probability that the required level of QoS can not be offered) and scheduling starvation. These performance measures are affected by mechanisms such as mobility management, radio resource management, admission control, fair scheduling, channel-dependent scheduling etc.

== Factors affecting QoS ==
Many factors affect the quality of service of a mobile network. It is correct to look at QoS mainly from the customer's point of view, that is, QoS as judged by the user. There are standard metrics of QoS to the user that can be measured to rate the QoS. These metrics are: the coverage, accessibility (includes GoS), and the audio quality. In coverage the strength of the signal is measured using test equipment and this can be used to estimate the size of the cell. Accessibility is about determining the ability of the network to handle successful calls from mobile-to-fixed networks and from mobile-to-mobile networks. The audio quality considers monitoring a successful call for a period of time for the clarity of the communication channel. All these indicators are used by the telecommunications industry to rate the quality of service of a network.

== Measurement of QoS ==
The QoS in industry is also measured from the perspective of an expert (e.g. teletraffic engineer). This involves assessing the network to see if it delivers the quality that the network planner has been required to target. Certain tools and methods (protocol analysers, drive tests and Operation and Maintenance measurements), are used for this QoS measurement:

- Protocol analysers are connected to BTSs, BSCs, and MSCs for a period of time to check for problems in the cellular network. When a problem is discovered the staff can record it and it can be analysed.
- Drive tests allow the mobile network to be tested through the use of a team of people who take the role of users and take the QoS measures discussed above to rate the QoS of the network. This test does not apply to the entire network, so it is always a statistical sample.
- In the Operation and Maintenance Centres (OMCs), counters are used in the system for various events which provide the network operator with information on the state and quality of the network.
- Finally, customer complaints are a vital source of feedback on the QoS, and must not be ignored.

== Cellular GoS ==
In general, grade of service (GoS) is measured by looking at traffic carried, traffic offered and calculating the traffic blocked and lost. The proportion of lost calls is the measure of GoS. For cellular circuit groups an acceptable GoS is 0.02. This means that two users of the circuit group out of a hundred will encounter a call refusal during the busy hour at the end of the planning period. The grade of service standard is thus the acceptable level of traffic that the network can lose. GoS is calculated from the Erlang-B formula, as a function of the number of channels required for the offered traffic intensity.

== Cellular audio quality ==
The audio quality of a cellular network depends on, among other factors, the modulation scheme (e.g., FSK, QPSK) in use, matching to the channel characteristics and the processing of the received signal at the receiver using DSPs.
