= Traffic mix =

Model in telecommunications

Traffic mix is a traffic model in telecommunication engineering and teletraffic theory.

== Definitions ==
A traffic mix is a modelisation of user behaviour. In telecommunications, user behaviour activities may be described by a number of systems, ranging from simple to complex. For example, for plain old telephone service (POTS), a sequence of connection requests to an exchange can be modelled by fitting negative exponential distributions to the average time between requests and the average duration of a connection. This in turn can be used to work out the utilisation of the line for the purposes of network planning and dimensioning.

== Objectives ==
Traffic mix has two goals:

- Network links dimensioning
- Network equipment dimensioning

Both these functions are extremely important to network operators. If insufficient capability is deployed at a node (for example, if a backbone router has 1 gigabit/sec of switching capacity and more than this is offered) then the risk of equipment failure increases, and customers experience poor service. However, if the network is overprovisioned the cost in equipment can be high. Most providers therefore seek to maximise the effect of their spending by maintaining an unused overhead capacity for growth, and expanding key nodes to relieve problem areas. Identification of these areas is accomplished by network dimensioning.

== Traffic mix type ==
=== Telephony traffic mix ===
- Call attempts per day
- Call holding time
- Mean holding time

=== Mobile telephony traffic mix ===
- Call attempts
- Call holding time
- Mean holding time
- Mean number of SMS send
- Mean number of SMS received
- User mobility

=== Internet traffic mix ===
- UL/DL acknowledged Kbs
- Packet Data Channel allocation successes
- User throughput
- Session/Packet interarrival time/Latency

== See also ==
- A. K. Erlang
- Call center
- Engset calculation
- Erlang distribution
- Poisson distribution
