= Core-and-pod =

Computer network design

Core-and-pod design is a computer network design that uses individual pods that hang off the core layer as modular units.

Within the pod, there may be only a single access layer or a "leaf and spine" network in the pod. The routed core layer serves as a fast and simple way to connect many generations of pods to each other. When the "leaf and spine" network is used within the pod, the core layer can be referred to as the “spine of spines,” since it is the thing that connects the "spines" of the pods. This design then resembles some kind of large and wide tree, with many "branches", or pods, off the main "trunk", or core.

This new design differs from the original "three-tier" architecture through the fact that the pods can be bundled as a unit. The units can be manipulated however the staff of the network pleases. The new design also requires the staff of the network to understand the many designs and tools that can be used to manage the different pod iterations.

== See also ==
- Network planning and design
- Data center network architectures
