= Tarm =

- Town
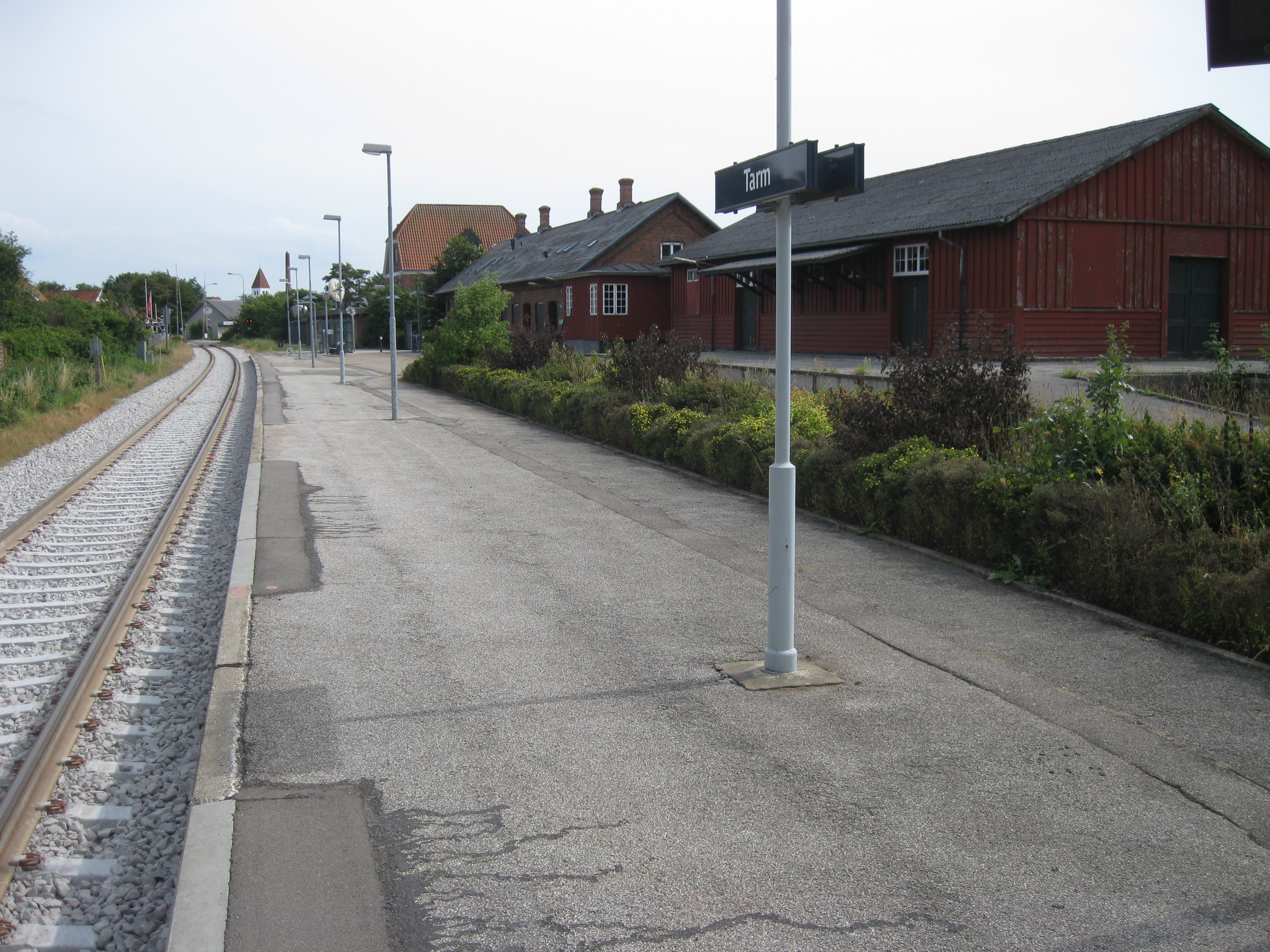
- Tarm railway station

- Location in Denmark Tarm (Central Denmark Region)
- Coordinates: 55°54′24″N 8°31′14″E
- country: Denmark
- Region: Region Midtjylland
- Municipality: Ringkøbing-Skjern

Area
  - Urban: 3.84 km^{2} (1.48 sq mi)

Population (2026)
  - Urban: 4,113
  - Urban density: 1,070/km^{2} (2,770/sq mi)
  - Gender: 2,035 males and 2,078 females
- Time zone: UTC+1 (CET)
  - Summer (DST): UTC+2 (CEST)
- Postal code: DK-6880 Tarm

Tarm is a small railway town with a population of 4,113 (1 January 2026) in west Denmark, 36 kilometres southwest of Herning (air distance). The road distance between Herning and Tarm is exactly 47.8 kilometres (29.7 mi) (Herning-Videbæk-Skjern-Tarm route). It is located in the Ringkøbing-Skjern Municipality.

== Notable people ==
- Agner Krarup Erlang (1878 at Lønborg, near Tarm – 1929) a Danish mathematician, statistician and engineer
- Asger Christensen (born 1958 in Tarm) a Danish politician, farmer and MEP
- Trine Troelsen (born 1985 in Tarm) a Danish team handball player, playing for FC Midtjylland Håndbold and for the Denmark women's national handball team
- Kennie Chopart (born 1990 in Tarm) a Danish footballer who plays for Icelandic side Reykjavik
