= Manhattan mobility model =

The Manhattan mobility model is a guide which leads the driver of a vehicle on the correct path. It is an urban type of mobility model for vehicular ad-hoc networks (VANET). The Manhattan mobility model uses a "grid road topology. It works optimally where streets are in an organized manner.

In this mobility model, mobile nodes move in horizontal or vertical direction on an urban map. The Manhattan model employs a probabilistic approach in the selection of nodes movements since, at each intersection, a vehicle chooses to keep moving in the same direction. The probability of going straight is 0.5 and taking a left or right is 0.25 each.

The Manhattan model is not suitable for highway systems. Although this model provides flexibility for the nodes to change the direction, it imposes geographic restrictions on node mobility.

== Important Characteristics of the Manhattan Mobility model ==
- The mobile node is allowed to move along the grid of horizontal and vertical streets on the map.
- At an intersection of a horizontal and a vertical street, the mobile node can turn left, right or go straight with certain probability.
- Excepting the above difference, the inter-node and intra-node relationships involved in the Manhattan model are the same as in the Freeway model.

== Sources ==
- Mobility Models, Broadcasting Methods and Factors Contributing Towards the Efficiency of the MANET Routing Protocols: Overview, Shafinaz Buruhanudeen, Mohamed Othman, Mazliza Othman, Borhanuddin Mohd Ali. Paper ID: 123
- Impact of Node Mobility on MANET Routing Protocols Models, Bhavyesh Divecha1, Ajith Abraham2, Crina Grosan2 and Sugata Sanyal3, Mumbai University, India. Centre for Quantifiable Quality of Service in Communication Systems, Norwegian University of Science and Technology, Norway. School of Technology and Computer Science, Tata Institute of Fundamental Research, India
- Mobility Models in Inter-Vehicle Communications Literature, Marco Fiore Politecnico di Torino
