= Offered load =

In the mathematical theory of probability, offered load is a concept in queuing theory. The offered load is a measure of traffic in a queue. The offered load is given by Little's law: the arrival rate into the queue (symbolized with λ) multiplied by the mean holding time (symbolized by τ), equals the average amount of time spent by items in the queue. Offered load is expressed in Erlang units or call-seconds per hour, a dimensionless measure.
