= Urban traffic modeling and analysis =

Urban traffic modeling and analysis is part of the advanced traffic intelligent management technologies that has become a crucial sector of Traffic management and control. Its main purpose is to predict congestion states of a specific urban transport network and propose improvements in the traffic network. Researches rely on three different informations. Historical and recent information of a traffic network about its density and flow, a model of the transport network infrastructure and algorithms referring to both spatial and temporal dimensions. The final objective is to provide a better optimization of the traffic infrastructure such as traffic lights. Those optimizations should result into a decrease of the travel times, pollution and fuel consumption.

To survey and manage traffic infrastructures, cities can provide themselves with Intelligent transportation system (ITS) which are especially meaningful in densely urbanized areas. They provide the possibility to better analyze and manage a transport network impact of external factors within a short-term vision, with the daily fluctuate density of the transport network. And over a long-term vision, with changes as th increase of motorization, urbanization, population growth and changes in population density. At another end, motorists can use Advanced traveler information system (ATIS) which bring processed data to the end user to help him taking the best directions.

Researchers work on different level to make progress into traffic analysis, by collecting traffic data from different sources, modeling traffic flows and network, and developing algorithms to either predict traffic states in a far or a short-term future.

== Data Source ==
The sources of which data can be collected to create a model are a key choice to the model and algorithms. Data can be collected through non embedded traffic monitoring devices as loop detectors. Those devices can register the number of vehicles passed in an interval giving the occupancy. Other sources are literally embedded into vehicles and collect position or other vehicle behavior during its full trip. Such devices can be wireless sensors like Global positioning system (GPS), floating car data (FCD) and mobile phones. These data can eventually be collected in real-time.

== Traffic Flow Models ==
=== Level of detail classification ===
Depending on how much details a model provide, it can be classified into several categories.

==== Microscopic models ====
Vehicles and drivers behavior are described with high details and individually on the traffic stream.

===== Car-following models =====
Based on the process of a vehicle following another, car-following models appeared in the sixties, being one of the first microscopic modelling approach.

====== Safe-distance models ======
Used to determine the distance headway between a vehicle and its predecessor. One of the simplest model in this category is the Pipe's rule, the basic assumption of this model is "A good rule for following another vehicle at a safe distance is to allow yourself at least the length of a car between your vehicle and the vehicle ahead for every ten miles per hour (16 km/h) of speed at which you are traveling" According to Pipe's car-following model, the minimum safe distance headway increases linearly with speed. A similar model was proposed by Forbes et al, Forbes' model considered the reaction time needed for the following car's driver to perceive the need to accelerate or decelerate. When compared to field measurement, a slight difference in the minimum distance headway at low and high speeds is observed.

====== Stimulus-response car-following models ======
Drivers try to conform to the behavior of the preceding vehicle, this process is based on the following principle :

response = sensitivity × stimulus

Usually the response correspond the acceleration or braking of the following vehicle, delayed by a reaction time. Driver's sensitivity has been denoted in numerous work including the work of Chandler et al. (1958), Gazis et al. (1961) and Leutzbach (1988).

====== Psycho-spacing models ======
Car-following models presume that the driver react to small changes in the precedent vehicle velocity even when the headway distances are very large or small. To address this problem, perceptual psychology insights have been used to show how drivers are subject to limitation in the perception of stimuli to which they are subjects.

Basic behavioral rules of such models are :

- At large spacings, the following driver is not influenced by velocity differences.
- At small spacings, some combinations of relative velocities and distance headways do not yield a response of the following driver, because the relative motion is too small.

The psycho-spacing models ability of describing transient traffic flow behaviour like capacity drop, and stability of wide jams (jams in which the velocity of traffic is near zero, and which propagate upstream with a near constant velocity) has been addressed by Krauss et al. (1999).

===== Microscopic Simulation models =====
Nowadays availability of fast personal computers has seen the development of a large number of microscopic simulation models usually based on the psycho-spacing modelling paradigm.

===== Cellular automaton models =====
Appeared recently in the domain of microscopic traffic flow theory, the cellular automaton describe the traffic system as a lattice of cells of equal size (typically 7.5m). A CA-model will describe the way a vehicle moves from cell to cell.

===== Particle models =====
Although these models distinguish and describe the vehicles individually, their behavior is described by aggregate equations of motions like in a macroscopic traffic flow model.

==== Submicroscopic models ====
Like microscopic models, vehicles and drivers behavior are described but submicroscopic models go even further by describing the vehicle control behavior and the functioning of specific parts of the vehicle.

==== Mesoscopic models ====
A mesoscopic model does not distinguish nor trace individual vehicles, but expresses the probability of having a given vehicle at a given position, time and velocity.

==== Macroscopic models ====
Traffic is represented at a high level of aggregation, thus not distinguishing vehicles individually.

=== Scale of application ===
The scale of application is determined by the size of the area on which the model is applied, from the portion of a roadway to an entire city or an even bigger area.

== Traffic prediction algorithms ==
Having models of traffic network data gathering several characteristics depending on its nature, there are many approaches and algorithms to harness them into practical cases.

=== Forecast algorithms ===
The methods historically used to determine forecast traffic states and density were thought to render a single-point forecasting result. These methods use only past measurements of identical situations. So, they can predict a density at a specific location. The following methods and algorithms uses this simple past-data approach but distinguish themselves by different criteria. To begin with, statical methods are based on auto-regression and moving average methods. They are implemented in algorithms such as ARMA, ARIMA (Integrated ARMA) or SARIMA (seasonal ARIMA). Other statistical methods based on non-parametric regression and variants exists as well. Using machine learning to forecast traffic models is being used based on multiple different algorithms including Vector regression (SVR), time-delay neural network (TDNN) or Bayesian network.

Newer methodologies taking into account data relational structure, forecast traffic density in time relying on linked data from multiple spatial positions at different moments in time, event future already predicted data. Studies using data relational structures have mainly used STARIMA models (space-time ARIMA), Kalman filters and Structural Time Series model. The use of a Statistical Relational Learning (SRL) framework is very effective to improve predictive accuracy of relational structured data. Statistical Relational Learning matches very well this field of research by its ability to describe dependencies and relations and include background knowledge in the model, as in a transportation network. Models generated with a Statistical Relational Learning method can represent a wide set of location thanks to its ability to perform concurrent grouping and regressions on its multiple sources and information levels. This makes it possible to such model to predict traffic conditions out of a network in a single inference process.

=== Specifications of model traffic characteristics ===
The existing multiple process algorithms use different proven methodologies, approaches and characteristics. Some of them have been noticed previously. Algorithms may differ depending on the data of their model is based on or the way they structure and link these data. So, models, often close to the way they manage data, can focus on either traffic volumes, travel speed, occupancy, road capacities etc. To do so, models often range from ARIMA to Dynamic Generalized Linear Models (Dynamic GLM) and Neural Networks.

To output useful data for ITS, algorithms which often are closely linked to the structure and capabilities of their model, will use a range of specifications considering the capabilities of the model. Algorithms often wants to forecast data in a long term or short-term perspective. To do so, their specifications ranged from Kalman filtering, exponential filtering, nonparametric statistical methods, spectral and cross-spectral analyses and sequential learning, to cusp catastrophe theory.

== See also ==
- Network theory
- Network science
- Urban traffic
- Neural networks
- Percolation theory
- Traffic congestion
