= Lønborg, Ringkøbing-Skjern =

Lønborg
- Village
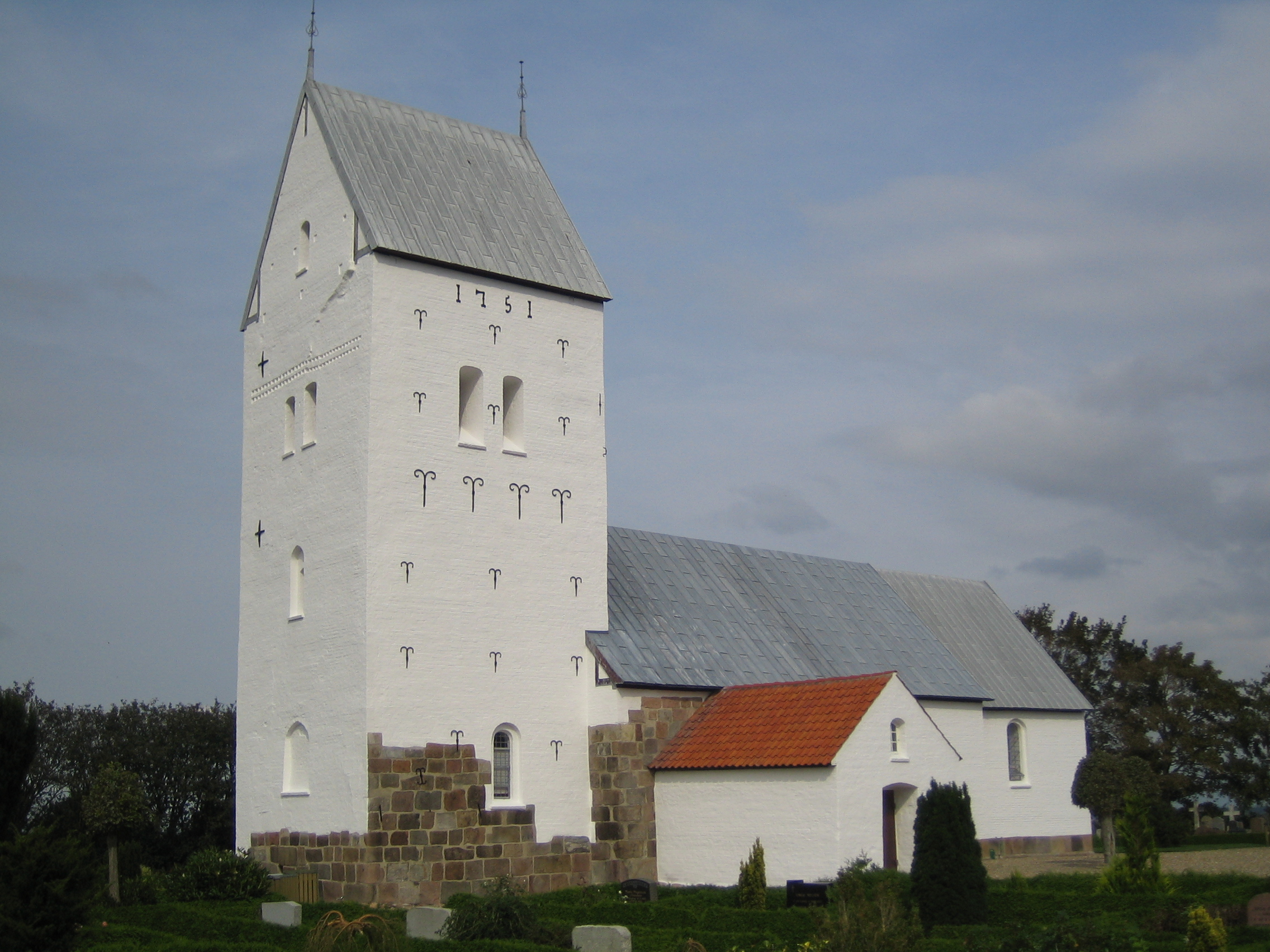
- Lønborg Church

- Location in Central Denmark Region Lønborg (Denmark)
- Coordinates: 55°54′13″N 8°26′37″E
- Country: Denmark
- Region: Central Denmark (Midtjylland)
- Municipality: Ringkøbing-Skjern

Population (2026)
  - Total: 244

Lønborg is a small village, with a population of 244 (1 January 2026), in Ringkøbing-Skjern Municipality, Central Denmark Region in Denmark. It is situated just south of Skjern River about 3 km east of its mouth in Ringkøbing Fjord.

Lønborg is located 18 km northeast of Nørre Nebel, 5 km west of Tarm and 8 km Southwest of Skjern.

Lønborg Church stands on a hilltop on the northern outskirts of the village overlooking the Skjern River delta.

== Notable people ==
- Agner Krarup Erlang (1878–1929), a Danish mathematician, statistician and engineer, was born at Lønborg.
