= László Tisza =

Hungarian physicist (1907–2009)

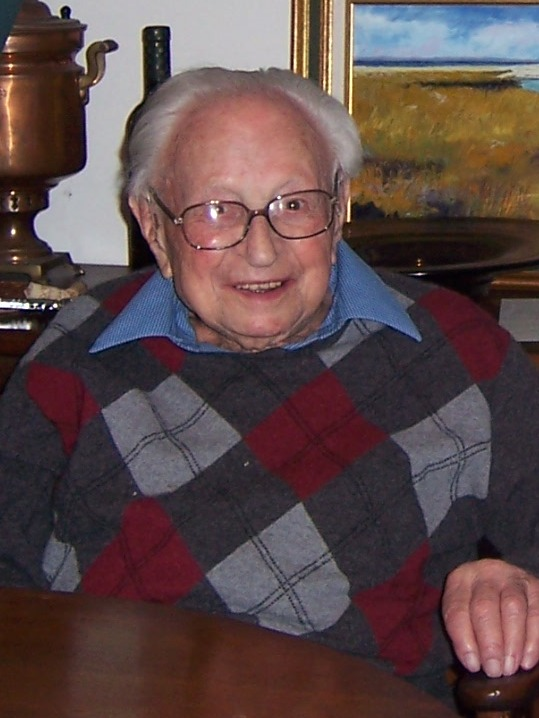
- Born: July 7, 1907; Budapest, Austro-Hungarian Empire
- Died: April 15, 2009 (aged 101); Cambridge, Massachusetts, U.S.
- Education: University of Budapest; University of Göttingen; Leipzig University
- Known for: Two-fluid model
- Awards: Fellow, American Physical Society; Fellow, American Academy of Arts and Sciences; Guggenheim Fellow
- Scientific career
- Fields: Theoretical physics Quantum mechanics Thermodynamics
- Workplaces: Kharkiv Theoretical Physics School; Collège de France; Massachusetts Institute of Technology
- Doctoral students: Martin J. Klein; Herbert Callen

László Tisza (July 7, 1907 – April 15, 2009) was a Hungarian-born American physicist who was Professor of Physics Emeritus at MIT. He was a colleague of famed physicists Edward Teller, Lev Landau and Fritz London, and initiated the two-fluid model of liquid helium.

== United States ==
In 1941, Tisza immigrated to the United States and joined the faculty at the Massachusetts Institute of Technology. His research areas included theoretical physics and the history and philosophy of science, specifically on the foundations of thermodynamics and quantum mechanics. He taught at MIT until 1973.

== Publications ==
Tisza was the author of the 1966 book, Generalized Thermodynamics. The 1982 publication, Physics as Natural Philosophy: Essays in Honor of László Tisza, was written by Tisza's colleagues and former students in honor of his 75th birthday.

== Affiliations ==
He was a Fellow of The American Physical Society and American Academy of Arts and Sciences, a John Simon Guggenheim Fellow and had been a visiting professor at the University of Paris in Sorbonne.

== See also ==
- Vera and Laszlo Tisza House
