= Radio map =

Map of radio signal strength in an area

Radio maps, also known as radio environment maps, describe how radio waves spread across a geographical region. The main types of radio maps are signal strength maps and propagation maps. Signal strength maps provide a metric that quantifies the received power at each location. In turn, propagation maps characterize the propagation channel between arbitrary pairs of locations.

Radio maps can be used in a large number of applications, especially in the context of wireless communications. For instance, network operators can use radio maps to determine where to deploy new base stations or how to allocate frequencies.

== Signal strength maps ==
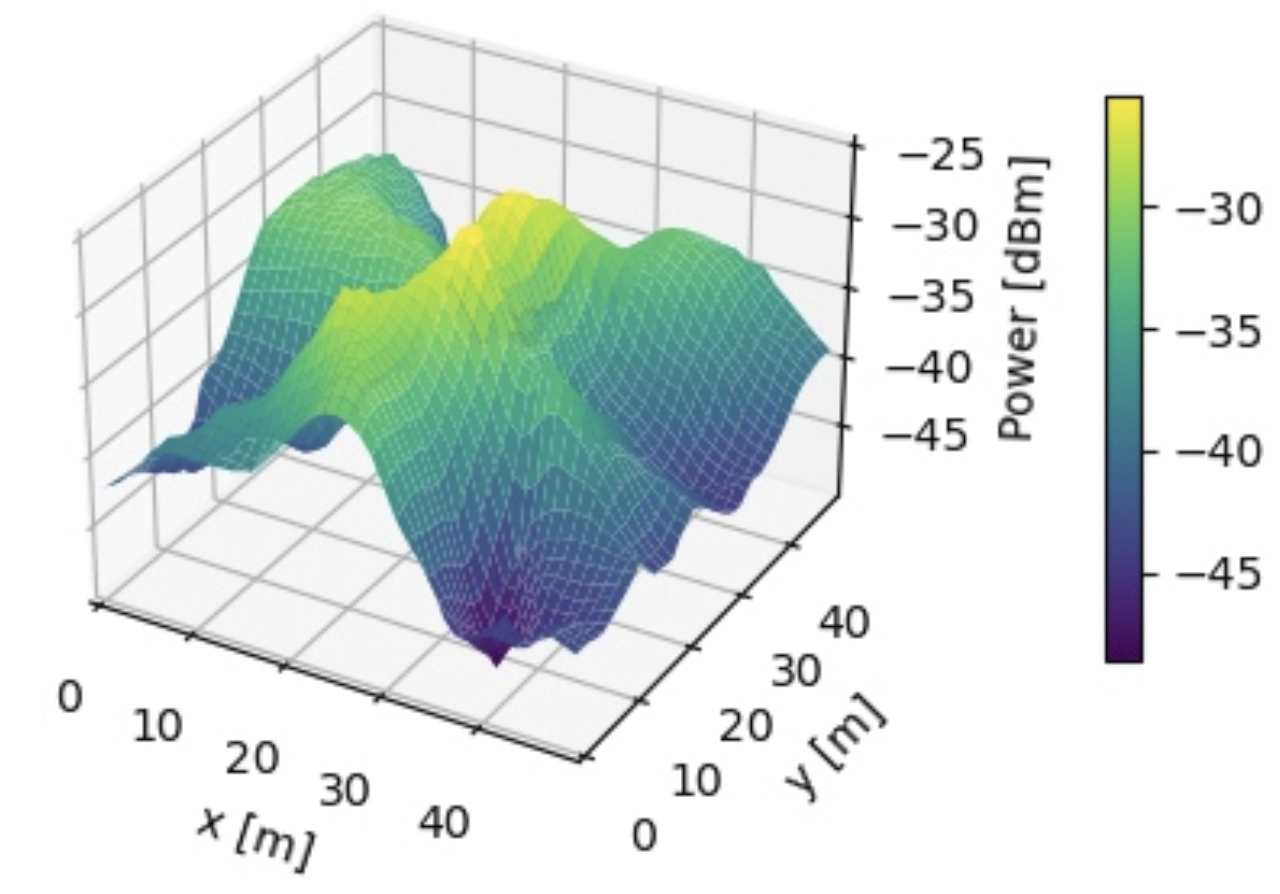
Example of a radio map estimate using STORM, a transformer-based radio map estimator.

Signal strength maps quantify signal strength at each location. Formally, a signal strength map can be seen as a function $\gamma(\mathbf{r})$ that provides a signal strength metric for each location $\mathbf{r}$. Here, $\mathbf{r}$ is a vector that contains the spatial coordinates of the location of interest.

Oftentimes, a signal strength map is represented by a matrix or tensor $\mathbf{\Gamma}$ that collects the values of $\gamma(\mathbf{r})$ on a set of points $\mathbf{r}$ that form a regular grid.

The types of signal strength maps, presented below, are determined by the signal strength metric that they provide.

=== Coverage Maps ===
In coverage maps, $\gamma(\mathbf{r})$ takes a binary value that indicates whether the received signal strength meets a certain quality objective. For example, in the case of digitally-modulated signals, such a quality objective can be a maximum admissible bit error rate.

Coverage maps are mainly used by operators to visualize the areas in which a certain service is successfully provided. The positions and sizes of regions with poor coverage can inform the operators on locations where new base stations can be deployed.

=== Outage Probability Maps ===
In outage probability maps, $\gamma(\mathbf{r})$ is the outage probability at location $\mathbf{r}$. Therefore, this kind of maps provides more rich information than coverage maps, since they may indicate the fraction of the time in which the signal strength meets the desired objective. Outages may occur for example due to small fading, due to moving obstacles in the signal propagation paths, or due to excessive interference.

=== Power Maps ===
In power maps, $\gamma(\mathbf{r})$ is the received signal strength at $\mathbf{r}$. This information is more detailed than the information provided by coverage or outage probability maps, which just indicate whether the signal strength is below or above a certain threshold. This is important because, depending on the signal strength, a certain radiocommunication link may adopt a different modulation and coding. This is the case, for example, of cellular communications.

=== PSD Map ===
Power spectral density (PSD) maps return the PSD at each location. Therefore, they are functions of the form $\gamma(\mathbf{r};f)$, where $f$ is the frequency variable. They constitute the most detailed form of radio maps, as they provide the distribution of signal power not only across space but also across the frequency domain.

PSD maps may be used e.g. by network operators to determine which frequency bands contain most interference.

== Propagation maps ==
Propagation maps characterize signal propagation between arbitrary pairs of locations. For this reason, a propagation radio map is a function $\gamma(\mathbf{r}_1,\mathbf{r}_2)$ of two locations $\mathbf{r}_1$ and $\mathbf{r}_2$. In the case of channel-gain maps, $\gamma(\mathbf{r}_1,\mathbf{r}_2)$ is the gain of the channel when the transmitter is at $\mathbf{r}_1$ and the receiver at $\mathbf{r}_2$ (or viceversa).

== Radio map construction ==
=== Simulation ===
A typical approach to construct a radio map is via ray-tracing software. These programs use a 3D model of the region of interest to predict how the waves radiated by a certain transmitter propagate to every location.

A more traditional approach is to use a radio propagation model. Some of these models are based on electromagnetic propagation theory, whereas others are empirical.

=== Radio map estimation ===
Radio map estimation (RME) comprises a collection of techniques used to estimate a radio map from measurements across the area of interest. These measurements may be collected by sensors or, simply, by communication terminals, which also act as sensors.

In many practical scenarios, RME may be more convenient than simulation approaches such as ray-tracing since the latter require detailed 3D models of the propagation scenario, which are seldom available in practice.

The most common algorithms for RME are Kriging, kernel methods, and deep learning.
