= Grade of service =

Concept in telecommunications engineering

In telecommunications engineering, and in particular teletraffic engineering, the quality of voice service is specified by two measures: the grade of service (GoS) and the quality of service (QoS).

The grade of service is the probability of a call in a circuit group being blocked or delayed for more than a specified interval, expressed as a vulgar fraction or decimal fraction. This is always with reference to the busy hour when the traffic intensity is the greatest. Grade of service may be viewed independently from the perspective of incoming versus outgoing calls, and is not necessarily equal in each direction or between different source-destination pairs. "Grade of Service" sometimes means a measure of inbound call center traffic to verify adherence to conditions to measure the success of customers served.

On the other hand, the quality of service which a single circuit is designed or conditioned to provide, e.g. voice grade or program grade is called the quality of service. Quality criteria for such circuits may include equalization for amplitude over a specified band of frequencies, or in the case of digital data transported via analogue circuits, may include equalization for phase. Criteria for mobile quality of service in cellular telephone circuits include the probability of abnormal termination of the call.

== What is Grade of Service and how is it measured? ==
When a user attempts to make a telephone call, the routing equipment handling the call has to determine whether to accept the call, reroute the call to alternative equipment, or reject the call entirely. Rejected calls occur as a result of heavy traffic loads (congestion) on the system and can result in the call either being delayed or lost. If a call is delayed, the user simply has to wait for the traffic to decrease, however if a call is lost then it is removed from the system.

The Grade of Service is one aspect of the quality a customer can expect to experience when making a telephone call. In a Loss System, the Grade of Service is described as that proportion of calls that are lost due to congestion in the busy hour. For a Lost Call system, the Grade of Service can be measured using Equation 1.

$$\mbox{Grade of Service}=\frac{\mbox{number of blocked calls}}{\mbox{total offered calls}}\qquad(1)$$

For a delayed call system, the Grade of Service is measured using three separate terms:

- The mean delay $t_d$ – Describes the average time a user spends waiting for a connection if their call is delayed.
- The mean delay $t_o$ – Describes the average time a user spends waiting for a connection whether or not their call is delayed.
- The probability that a user may be delayed longer than time t while waiting for a connection. Time t is chosen by the telecommunications service provider so that they can measure whether their services conform to a set Grade of Service.
- Where and when is Grade of Service measured?

The Grade of Service can be measured using different sections of a network. When a call is routed from one end to another, it will pass through several exchanges. If the Grade of Service is calculated based on the number of calls rejected by the final circuit group, then the Grade of Service is determined by the final circuit group blocking criteria. If the Grade of Service is calculated based on the number of rejected calls between exchanges, then the Grade of Service is determined by the exchange-to-exchange blocking criteria.

The Grade of Service should be calculated using both the access networks and the core networks as it is these networks that allow a user to complete an end-to-end connection. Furthermore, the Grade of Service should be calculated from the average of the busy hour traffic intensities of the 30 busiest traffic days of the year. This will cater for most scenarios as the traffic intensity will seldom exceed the reference level.

The grade of service is a measure of the ability of a user to access a trunk system during the busiest hour. The busy is based upon customer demand at the busiest hour during a week month or year.

== Class of Service ==
Different telecommunications applications require different Qualities of Service. For example, if a telecommunications service provider decides to offer different qualities of voice connection, then a premium voice connection will require a better connection quality compared to an ordinary voice connection. Thus different Qualities of Service are appropriate, depending on the intended use. To help telecommunications service providers to market their different services, each service is placed into a specific class. Each Class of Service determines the level of service required.

To identify the Class of Service for a specific service, the network's switches and routers examine the call based on several factors. Such factors can include:

- The type of service and priority due to precedence
- The identity of the initiating party
- The identity of the recipient party

== Quality of Service in broadband networks ==
In broadband networks, the Quality of Service is measured using two criteria. The first criterion is the probability of packet losses or delays in already accepted calls. The second criterion refers to the probability that a new incoming call will be rejected or blocked. To avoid the former, broadband networks limit the number of active calls so that packets from established calls will not be lost due to new calls arriving. As in circuit-switched networks, the Grade of Service can be calculated for individual switches or for the whole network.

== Maintaining a Grade of Service ==
The telecommunications provider is usually aware of the required Grade of Service for a particular product. To achieve and maintain a given Grade of Service, the operator must ensure that sufficient telecommunications circuits or routes are available to meet a specific level of demand. It should also be kept in mind that too many circuits will create a situation where the operator is providing excess capacity which may never be used, or at the very least may be severely underutilized. This adds costs which must be borne by other parts of the network. To determine the correct number of circuits that are required, telecommunications service providers make use of Traffic Tables. An example of a Traffic Table can be viewed in Figure 1. It follows that in order for a telecommunications network to continue to offer a given Grade of Service, the number of circuits provided in a circuit group must increase (non-linearly) if the traffic intensity increases.

== Erlang's lost call assumptions ==
To calculate the Grade of Service of a specified group of circuits or routes, Agner Krarup Erlang used a set of assumptions that relied on the network losing calls when all circuits in a group were busy. These assumptions are:

- All traffic through the network is pure-chance traffic, i.e. all call arrivals and terminations are independent random events
- There is statistical equilibrium, i.e., the average number of calls does not change
- Full availability of the network, i.e., every outlet from a switch is accessible from every inlet
- Any call that encounters congestion is immediately lost.

From these assumptions Erlang developed the Erlang-B formula which describes the probability of congestion in a circuit group. The probability of congestion gives the Grade of Service experienced.

== Calculating the Grade of Service ==
To determine the Grade of Service of a network when the traffic load and number of circuits are known, telecommunications network operators make use of Equation 2, which is the Erlang-B equation.

$$\mbox{Grade of Service}=\frac{\left(\frac{A^N}{N!}\right)}{\left(\sum_{k=0}^N\frac{A^k}{k!}\right)}\qquad(2)$$

A = Expected traffic intensity in Erlangs, N = Number of circuits in group.

This equation allows operators to determine whether each of their circuit groups meet the required Grade of Service, simply by monitoring the reference traffic intensity.

(For delay networks, the Erlang-C formula allows network operators to determine the probability of delay depending on peak traffic and the number of circuits.)
