= Engset formula =

In queueing theory, the Engset formula is used to determine the blocking probability of an M/M/c/c/N queue (in Kendall's notation).

The formula is named after its developer, T. O. Engset.

== Example application ==
Consider a fleet of $c$ vehicles and $N$ operators. Operators enter the system randomly to request the use of a vehicle. If no vehicles are available, a requesting operator is "blocked" (i.e., the operator leaves without a vehicle). The owner of the fleet would like to pick $c$ small so as to minimize costs, but large enough to ensure that the blocking probability is tolerable.

== Formula ==
Let

- $c > 0$ be the (integer) number of servers.
- $N > c$ be the (integer) number of sources of traffic;
- $\lambda > 0$ be the idle source arrival rate (i.e., the rate at which a free source initiates requests);
- $h > 0$ be the average holding time (i.e., the average time it takes for a server to handle a request);

Then, the probability of blocking is given by

$$P=\frac{\binom{N-1}{c}\left(\lambda h\right)^{c}}{\sum_{i=0}^{c}\binom{N-1}{i}\left(\lambda h\right)^{i}}.$$

By rearranging terms, one can rewrite the above formula as

$$P = \frac{1}{ {}_2 F_1(1,-c;N-c;-1/(\lambda h) ) }$$

where ${}_2 F_1$ is the Gaussian hypergeometric function.

=== Computation ===
There are several recursions that can be used to compute $P$ in a numerically stable manner.

Alternatively, any numerical package that supports the hypergeometric function can be used. Some examples are given below.

Python with SciPy

from scipy.special import hyp2f1
P = 1.0 / hyp2f1(1, -c, N - c, -1.0 / (Lambda * h))

MATLAB with the Symbolic Math Toolbox

P = 1 / hypergeom([1, -c], N - c, -1 / (Lambda * h))

== Unknown source arrival rate ==
In practice, it is often the case that the source arrival rate $\lambda$ is unknown (or hard to estimate) while $\alpha > 0$, the offered traffic per-source, is known. In this case, one can substitute the relationship

$$\lambda h=\frac{\alpha}{1-\alpha(1-P)}$$

between the source arrival rate and blocking probability into the Engset formula to arrive at the fixed point equation

$$P = f(P)$$

where

$$f(P) = \frac{1}{ {}_2 F_1(1,-c;N-c;1-P-1/\alpha) }.$$

=== Computation ===
While the above removes the unknown $\lambda$ from the formula, it introduces an additional point of complexity: we can no longer compute the blocking probability directly, and must use an iterative method instead. While a fixed-point iteration is tempting, it has been shown that such an iteration is sometimes divergent when applied to $f$. Alternatively, it is possible to use one of bisection or Newton's method, for which an open source implementation is available.
