= Macroscopic traffic flow model =

Mathematical model formulating traffic flow relationships

A macroscopic traffic flow model is a mathematical traffic model that formulates the relationships among traffic flow characteristics like density, flow, mean speed of a traffic stream, etc. Such models are conventionally arrived at by integrating microscopic traffic flow models and converting the single-entity level characteristics to comparable system level characteristics. An example is the two-fluid model.

The method of modeling traffic flow at macroscopic level originated under an assumption that traffic streams as a whole are comparable to fluid streams. The first major step in macroscopic modeling of traffic was taken by Lighthill and Whitham in 1955, when they indexed the comparability of ‘traffic flow on long crowded roads’ with ‘flood movements in long rivers’. A year later, Richards (1956) complemented the idea with the introduction of ‘shock-waves on the highway’, completing the so-called LWR model. Macroscopic modeling may be primarily classified according to the type of traffic as homogeneous and heterogeneous, and further with respect to the order of the mathematical model.
