= Flow control =

Flow control may refer to:

- Flow control (data), in communications
  - Ethernet flow control
- Flow control (fluid), in fluid dynamics
- Air traffic flow control

== See also ==
- Control flow, in computing
