= Two-fluid model =

Model for superfluidity and traffic

In condensed matter physics, the two-fluid model is a macroscopic model to explain superfluidity. The idea was suggested by László Tisza in 1938 and reformulated by Lev Landau in 1941 to explain the behavior of superfluid helium-4. This model states that there will be two components in liquid helium below its lambda point (the temperature where superfluid forms). These components are a normal fluid and an ideal fluid component. Each liquid has a different density and together their sum makes the total density, which remains constant. The ratio of superfluid density to the total density increases as the temperature approaches absolute zero.

== Equations ==
The two-fluid model can be described by a system of coupled inviscid and viscous fluid system, in the low velocity limit, the equations are given by

$$\rho_{\rm n} \frac{\partial \mathbf v_{\rm n}}{\partial t}+\rho_{\rm n} (\mathbf v_{\rm n} \cdot \nabla) \mathbf v_{\rm n}=-\frac{\rho_{\rm n}}{\rho}\nabla p - \rho_{\rm s} \sigma \nabla T +\eta\nabla^2 \mathbf v_{\rm n} ;$$

$$\rho_{\rm s} \frac{\partial \mathbf v_{\rm s}}{\partial t}+\rho_{\rm s} (\mathbf v_{\rm s} \cdot\nabla) \mathbf v_{\rm s}=-\frac{\rho_{\rm s}}{\rho}\nabla p + \rho_{\rm s} \sigma \nabla T,$$

where the $P$ is the pressure, $T$ is the temperature, $\eta$ is the viscosity of the normal component, $\sigma$ is the entropy per unit mass, and $\rho=\rho_{\rm s}+\rho_{\rm n}$ is the density as the sum of the density of the two components such that it follows a continuity equation

$$\frac{\partial \rho}{\partial t}+\nabla \cdot \mathbf J =0,$$

where the total flow is given by

$$\mathbf J = \rho_{\rm s} \mathbf v_{\rm s} +\rho_{\rm n} \mathbf v_{\rm n} .$$

These corresponds to a coupled Navier-Stokes equations (normal component) to Euler equations (ideal superfluid component).

== Application to traffic ==
There is also a two-fluid model also refers to a macroscopic traffic flow model to represent traffic in a town/city or metropolitan area, put forward in the 1970s by Ilya Prigogine and Robert Herman. It was inspired by the superfluid model.

== See also ==
- Quantum turbulence
