= Tele-information services =

Tele-information services are based on an alliance of digital telecommunication and computer technology that play an important role in inter-human communications. It is a classification of information flows broken down so that the presentation and information content are not confused with the character of the information flow. Tele-information services consist of four definable information traffic patterns being allocution, conversation, consultation and registration. These information traffic patterns can be combined to form more complex multi-pattern services and networks made up of any number of information traffic patterns.

== Information traffic patterns ==
- Allocution — the issue of information by an information service centre under programmatic control of the centre itself. Typically has a general/soldier, master/slave relationship. Examples include broadcasting organisations such as radio and television.
- Conversation — the issue of information by information services consumer(s) under programmatic control of the consumer(s) themselves. Examples include information flow between consumers or with the help of an interpreter.
- Consultation — the issue of information by an information service provider under programmatic control of an information service consumer. Examples include phoning a doctor, lawyer, reading books, magazines and newspapers as well as cable television and the Internet.
- Registration — the issue of information by an information service consumer under the programmatic control of an information service centre. Examples include a fire alarm, news agencies and some MMORPG (Massively Multiplayer Online Role-Playing Game) such as World of Warcraft.
