= Random waypoint model =

In mobility management, the random waypoint model is a random model for the movement of mobile users, and how their location, velocity and acceleration change over time. Mobility models are used for simulation purposes when new network protocols are evaluated. The random waypoint model was first proposed by Johnson and Maltz. It is one of the most popular mobility models to evaluate mobile ad hoc network (MANET) routing protocols, because of its simplicity and wide availability.

In random-based mobility simulation models, the mobile nodes move randomly and freely without restrictions. To be more specific, the destination, speed and direction are all chosen randomly and independently of other nodes. This kind of model has been used in many simulation studies.

Two variants, the random walk model and the random direction model are variants of the random waypoint model.

== Description of model ==
The movement of nodes is governed in the following manner: Each node begins by pausing for a fixed number of seconds. The node then selects a random destination in the simulation area and a random speed between 0 (excluded) and some maximum speed. The node moves to this destination and again pauses for a fixed period before another random location and speed. This behaviour is repeated for the length of the simulation.

Simulation of model

BonnMotion is one of the tool to generate mobility scenarios based on random waypoint model and many other mobility models including random walk model, random direction model, etc.

== Orientation-based Random Waypoint ==
In the context of mmWave communication, optical wireless communication, and Terahertz networks, the orientation of a device is also important (in contrast to the radio frequency networks). Therefore, it is essential to incorporate the orientation of the device with the mobility model. This concept was first introduced in the paper entitled "Modeling the Random Orientation of Mobile Devices: Measurement, Analysis and LiFi Use Case".
