= Mobility model =

Mobility models characterize the movements of mobile users with respect to their location, velocity and direction over a period of time. These models play a vital role in the design of Mobile Ad Hoc Networks(MANET). Most of the times simulators play a significant role in testing the features of mobile ad hoc networks. Simulators like (NS, QualNet, etc.) allow the users to choose the mobility models as these models represent the movements of nodes or users. As the mobile nodes move in different directions, it becomes imperative to characterize their movements vis-à-vis to standard models. The mobility models proposed in literature have varying degrees of realism i.e. from random patterns to realistic patterns. Thus these models contribute significantly while testing the protocols for mobile ad hoc networks.

== Background and terminology ==
The study of large and complex networks is possible by experimenting on a simulator rather than on analytical studies. The relatively new form of networks like Mobile Ad Hoc Networks(MANET), Vehicular Ad Hoc Networks (VANET), etc. are characterized by nodes which are autonomous and dynamic in nature. Thus it becomes very essential to capture their movements so that the corresponding simulations results are nearer to reality. Mobility models are basically classified as stochastic, detailed, Hybrid and Trace based Realistic models.

- The stochastic models are based on random movements and the nodes are free to move in any direction. Example include Random waypoint model, Random walk and Random direction model.
- The detailed models are tailored for specific scenarios. This could include meetings, library and classroom scenarios. Example includes Street random waypoint (STRAW),
- The Hybrid models try to strike a balance between realism (Detailed models) and freedom of movements(Stochastic models). Examples include Reference point group mobility model, Manhattan mobility model and Freeway mobility model.
- The Real trace models contain a collection of movements of realistic users based on specific scenarios. Example includes CRAWDAD.

== Mobility models ==
For mobility modelling, the behavior or activity of a user's movement can be described using both analytical and simulation models. The input to analytical mobility models are simplifying assumptions regarding the movement behaviors of users. Such models can provide performance parameters for simple cases through mathematical calculations. In contrast, simulation models consider more detailed and realistic mobility scenarios. Such models can derive valuable solutions for more complex cases. Typical mobility models include

- Random waypoint model
- Random walk model
- Random direction model
- Street random waypoint
- Reference point group model (RPGM)
- Manhattan mobility model
- Freeway mobility model

== Metrics for Mobility Models ==
Mobility model metrics are useful to study the impact of mobility models on the performances of mobile ad hoc networks. Metrics are usually classified as mobility metrics, connectivity graph metrics and protocol performance metrics.

- The mobility metrics usually speaks about the mobility patterns. These include spatial dependence, temporal dependence, relative speed and geographic restrictions.
- The connectivity graph metrics speaks about the number of link changes, link duration, path duration and path availability.
- The protocol performance metrics speaks about throughput and routing overhead.

== See also ==
- Mobility management
- Mobile ad hoc network (MANET)
- Radio propagation models
- Network simulation
- Network simulator
- Network traffic simulation
- Radio resource management (RRM)
- Traffic generation model
