= Agner Krarup Erlang =

Danish mathematician, statistician and engineer

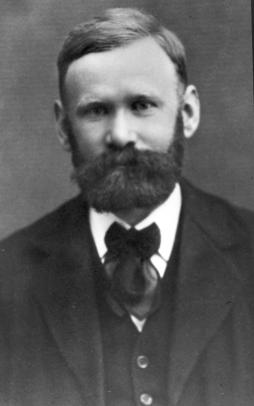
- Born: 1 January 1878; Lønborg, Denmark
- Died: 3 February 1929 (aged 51); Copenhagen, Denmark
- Resting place: Sundby Kirkegård, København, Denmark
- Education: University of Copenhagen
- Occupations: Mathematician, statistician, and engineer

Agner Krarup Erlang (1 January 1878 – 3 February 1929) was a Danish mathematician, statistician and engineer, who invented the fields of teletraffic engineering and queueing theory.

Erlang's 1909 paper, and subsequent papers over the decades, are regarded as containing some of most important concepts and techniques for queueing theory.

By the time of his relatively early death at the age of 51, Erlang had created the field of telephone networks analysis. His early work in scrutinizing the use of local, exchange and trunk telephone line usage in a small community to understand the theoretical requirements of an efficient network led to the creation of the Erlang formula, which became a foundational element of modern telecommunications network studies.

== Life ==
Erlang was born at Lønborg, near Tarm, in Jutland. He was the son of a schoolmaster, and a descendant of Thomas Fincke on his mother's side. At age 14, he passed the Preliminary Examination of the University of Copenhagen with distinction, after receiving dispensation to take it because he was younger than the usual minimum age. For the next two years he taught alongside his father.

A distant relative provided free board and lodging while Erlang prepared for and took the University of Copenhagen entrance examination in 1896; he passed with distinction. He won a scholarship to the university and majored in mathematics, also studying astronomy, physics and chemistry. He graduated in 1901 with an MA and over the next 7 years taught at several schools. He maintained his interest in mathematics, and received an award for a paper that he submitted to the University of Copenhagen.

He was a member of the Danish Mathematicians' Association (DMF) and through this met amateur mathematician Johan Jensen, the Chief Engineer of the Copenhagen Telephone Company (KTAS in Danish), an offshoot of the International Bell Telephone Company. Erlang worked for the Copenhagen Telephone Company from 1908 for almost 20 years, until his death in Copenhagen after an abdominal operation.

He was an associate of the British Institution of Electrical Engineers.

== Contributions ==
While working for the CTC, Erlang was presented with the classic problem of determining how many circuits were needed to provide an acceptable telephone service. His thinking went further by finding how many telephone operators were needed to handle a given volume of calls. Most telephone exchanges then used human operators and cord boards to switch telephone calls by means of jack plugs.

Out of necessity, Erlang was a hands-on researcher. He would conduct measurements and was prepared to climb into street manholes to do so. He was also an expert in the history and calculation of the numerical tables of mathematical functions, particularly logarithms. He devised new calculation methods for certain forms of tables.

He developed his theory of telephone traffic over several years. His significant publications include:

- 1909 – "The Theory of Probabilities and Telephone Conversations", which proves that the Poisson distribution applies to random telephone traffic.
- 1917 – "Solution of some Problems in the Theory of Probabilities of Significance in Automatic Telephone Exchanges", which contains his classic formulae for call loss and waiting time.
- 1920 – "Telephone waiting times", which is Erlang's principal work on waiting times, assuming constant holding times.

These and other notable papers were translated into English, French and German. His papers were prepared in a very brief style and can be difficult to understand without a background in the field. One Bell Telephone Laboratories researcher is said to have learned Danish to study them.

The British Post Office accepted his formula as the basis for calculating circuit facilities.

In 1946, the CCITT named the international unit of telephone traffic the "erlang". A statistical distribution and programming language listed below have also been named in his honour.

Erlang also made an important contribution to physiologic modeling with the Krogh-Erlang capillary cylinder model describing oxygen supply to living tissue.

== See also ==
- Erlang – a unit of communication activity
- Erlang distribution – a statistical probability distribution
- Erlang programming language – developed by Ericsson for large industrial real-time systems
- Queueing theory
- Teletraffic engineering
