= Caulophryne bacescui =

Conservation status
- Data Deficient (IUCN 3.1)

Scientific classification
- Kingdom: Animalia
- Phylum: Chordata
- Class: Actinopterygii
- Order: Lophiiformes
- Family: Caulophrynidae
- Genus: Caulophryne
- Species: C. bacescui

Binomial name
- Caulophryne bacescui Mihai-Bardan, 1982

Species of fish

Caulophryne bacescui is a species of marine ray-finned fishes belonging to the family Caulophrynidae, the fanfins or hairy anglerfishes. It is known from a single specimen collected from the Eastern Pacific Ocean.

== Taxonomy ==
Caulophryne bacescui was first formally described in 1982 by the Romanian biologist Alina Mihai-Bardan from a single specimen taken from the Peru-Chile Trench in the Eastern Pacific Ocean off western South America. This species is classified within the genus Caulophryne, which is one of two genera within the family Caulophrynidae. The 5th edition of Fishes of the World classifies the Caulophrynidae within the suborder Ceratioidei of the order Lophiiformes, the anglerfishes.

== Etymology ==
Caulophryne bacescui is a species within the genus Caulophryne. The generic name is a combination of caulis "stem", an allusion to the stem-like base of the illicium, and phryne "toad", a suffix commonly used in the names of anglerfish genera. Its use may date as far back as Aristotle and Cicero, who referred to anglerfishes as "fishing-frogs" and "sea-frogs", respectively, possibly because of a physical resemblance. The specific name honours the Romanian zoologist Mihai C. Băcescu of the Grigore Antipa National Museum of Natural History, who was a participant in the 1965 cruise on which the holotype was obtained. Băcescu gave guidance to Mihai-Bardan in the writing of her description.

== Description ==
Caulophryne bacescui is known from a single specimen which has a standard length of 16.9 cm (6.7 in). This specimen was an adult female and differed from other species within Caulophryne by having no filaments on its illicium; having 46 teeth in its upper jaw, a similar number to C. polynema; and by having relatively low ray counts in the dorsal and anal fins, 15 and 14 respectively; the closest within the genus is C. pelagica.

== Distribution and habitat ==
Caulophryne bacescui is known from a single specimen collected in the Peru Trench off the western coast of South America in 1965. It is a benthopelagic species which lives in trenches and abyssal habitats.
