= Cobitis dalmatina =

Conservation status
- Endangered (IUCN 3.1)

Scientific classification
- Kingdom: Animalia
- Phylum: Chordata
- Class: Actinopterygii
- Order: Cypriniformes
- Family: Cobitidae
- Genus: Cobitis
- Species: C. dalmatina

Binomial name
- Cobitis dalmatina S. L. Karaman, 1928

Synonyms
- Cobitis taenia dalmatina Karaman, 1928

Species of fish

Cobitis dalmatina (Croatian: Cetinski vijun) is a species of ray-finned fish in the true loach family (Cobitidae). It is endemic to Croatia. This fish was long believed to be part of the widespread spined loach (C. taenia).

Cladistic analysis of DNA sequence data (nDNA RAG-1 and S7 ribosomal protein intron 1, and mtDNA cytochrome b) confirms that it is properly treated as full species. It belongs to a group including C. bilineata, C. narentana and an undescribed species from the Bosnian-Croatian border region. The Adriatic endemics separated from the ancestors of C. bilineata, today widespread immediately south of the Alps, around 6–5.5 million years ago. This was during the Messinian salinity crisis, when drainage basins throughout the Mediterranean region changed their course. C. dalmatina appears to be quite similar to C. narentana as regards the mitochondrial DNA sequence, but the nuclear DNA sequences differ far more. This typically occurs in cases of hybridization between distinct but related species. In the present case, C. narentana would have mated with C. dalmatina males, perhaps during some Pliocene glacial.

Its natural habitats is the Cetina River basin. It is threatened by habitat loss.

It can grow to 6.7 cm (2.6 in) standard length.
