= Cobitis ohridana =

Conservation status
- Near Threatened (IUCN 3.1)

Scientific classification
- Kingdom: Animalia
- Phylum: Chordata
- Class: Actinopterygii
- Order: Cypriniformes
- Family: Cobitidae
- Genus: Cobitis
- Species: C. ohridana

Binomial name
- Cobitis ohridana S. L. Karaman, 1928

Synonyms
- Cobitis taenia ohridana Karaman, 1928

Species of fish

Cobitis ohridana is a species of ray-finned fish in the true loach family (Cobitidae). It is only found in Albania, Montenegro, Serbia, North Macedonia, and Greece. This fish was long believed to be part of the widespread spined loach (C. taenia).

Cladistic analysis of DNA sequence data (nDNA RAG-1 and S7 ribosomal protein intron 1, and mtDNA cytochrome b) confirms that it is properly treated as full species. Its closest living relative might be C. zanandreai of Lake Fondi and its surroundings in west-central Italy. In that case these species separated probably around 6 million years ago in the Late Miocene, perhaps during the early Messinian salinity crisis. Alternatively, these two might simply be independently derived from a common ancestor in the course of these events but probably somewhat earlier, and appear similar on the molecular level due to convergent evolution.

Its natural habitats are Lake Ohrid and Lake Scutari, and the adjacent Drim River and Morača River basins. It is an abundant species in its home range and not considered threatened by the IUCN.

It can grow to 6.8 cm (2.7 in) standard length.
