= Cobitis hellenica =

Conservation status
- Endangered (IUCN 3.1)

Scientific classification
- Kingdom: Animalia
- Phylum: Chordata
- Class: Actinopterygii
- Order: Cypriniformes
- Family: Cobitidae
- Genus: Cobitis
- Species: C. hellenica

Binomial name
- Cobitis hellenica Economidis & Nalbant, 1996

Species of fish

Cobitis hellenica is a species of ray-finned fish in the true loach family (Cobitidae). It is endemic to Greece.

It belongs to the subgenus Bicanestrinia, together with C. arachthosensis, C. meridionalis and C. trichonica. According to cladistic analysis of DNA sequence data (nDNA RAG-1 and S7 ribosomal protein intron 1, and mtDNA cytochrome b), the first of these is an extremely close relative and might arguably be included in the present species. C. arachthosensis is only found in the Arachthos River basin, parapatric to the range of C. hellenica.

Its natural habitats are the Louros and Thyamis River basins. It is threatened by habitat loss.
