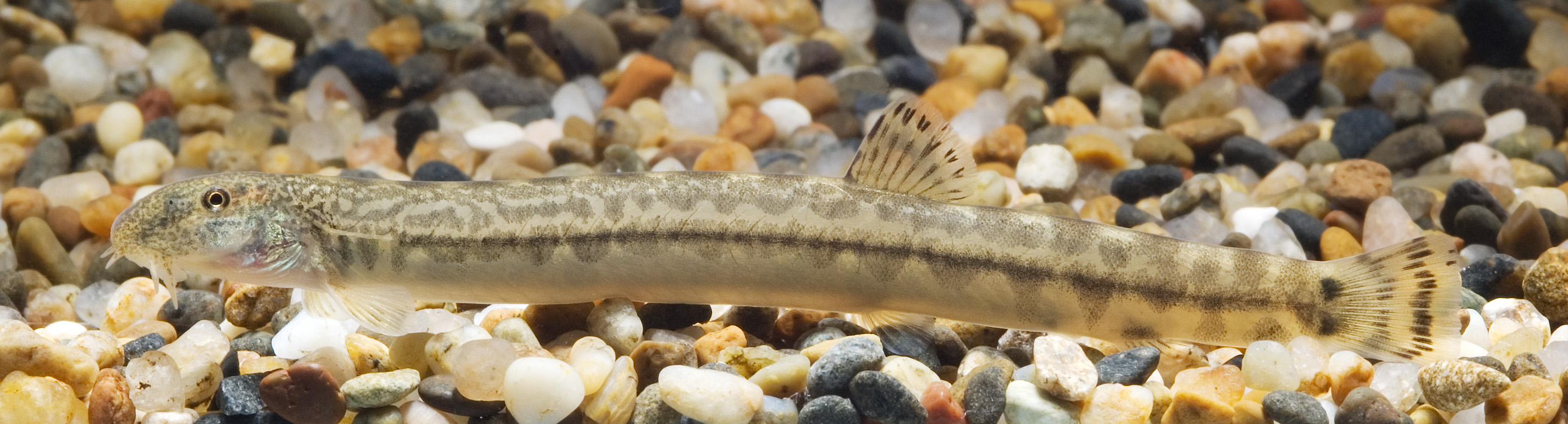
- Cobitis delicata
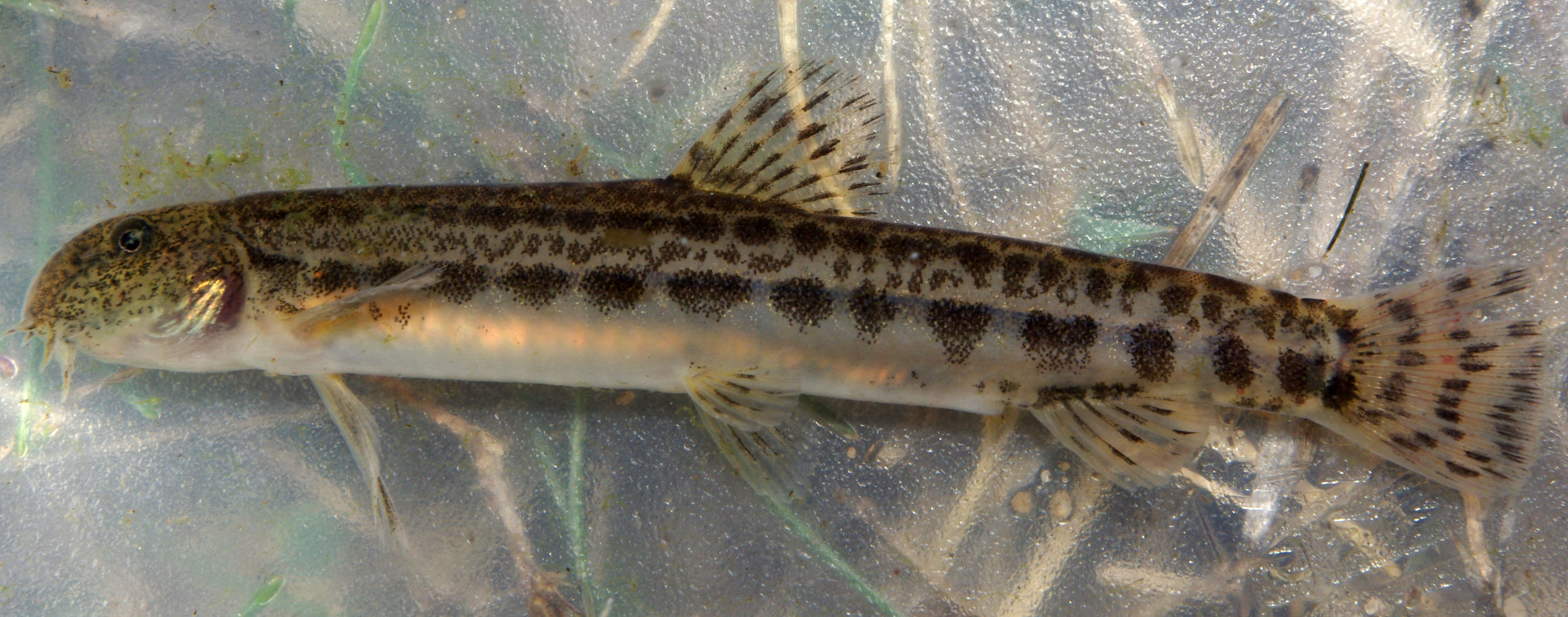
- Cobitis paludica

Scientific classification
- Kingdom: Animalia
- Phylum: Chordata
- Class: Actinopterygii
- Division: Teleostei
- Order: Cypriniformes
- Family: Cobitidae
- Genus: Cobitis; Linnaeus, 1758

Type species
- Cobitis taenia Linnaeus, 1758

Species
- See text

Synonyms
- Acanestrinia Bǎcescu, 1962; Acanthopsis Agassiz, 1832; Acantophthalmus van Hasselt, 1823; Beyshehiria Erk'akan, Ekmekçi & Nalbant, 1999; Bicanestrinia Bǎcescu, 1962; Cobitinula Hankó, 1924; Iberocobitis Bǎcescu, 1962; Iksookimia Nalbant, 1993; Kichulchoia Kim, Park & Nalbant, 1999; Niwaella Nalbant, 1963

= Cobitis =

Genus of fishes

Cobitis is a genus of small freshwater fish in the family Cobitidae from temperate and subtropical Eurasia. It contains the "typical spiny loaches", including the well-known spined loach of Europe. Similar spiny loaches, occurring generally south of the range of Cobitis, are nowadays separated in Sabanejewia.

== Species ==
There are currently 130 recognized species in this genus:

- Cobitis afifeae Freyhof, Bayçelebi & Geiger, 2018
- Cobitis aliyeae Freyhof, Bayçelebi & Geiger, 2018
- Cobitis almadae Doadrio, Sousa-Santos & Robalo, 2023
- Cobitis amphilekta Vasil'eva & Vasil'ev, 2012 (Khvalyn spined loach)
- Cobitis anabelae Freyhof, Bayçelebi & Geiger, 2018
- Cobitis arachthosensis Economidis & Nalbant, 1996
- Cobitis arenae (S. Y. Lin, 1934)
- Cobitis atlantica Doadrio, Sousa-Santos, Robalo & Perea, 2023
- Cobitis austiumensis Endruweit, 2025
- Cobitis australis Y. X. Chen, Y. F. Chen & D. K. He, 2013
- Cobitis avicennae Mousavi-Sabet, Vatandoust, Esmaeili, Geiger & Freyhof, 2015 (Zagros spined loach)
- Cobitis baishagensis Y. X. Chen, X. Y. Sui, N. Liang & Y. F. Chen, 2015
- Cobitis battalgilae Băcescu, 1962 (Battalgil's spined loach)
- Cobitis beijingensis Sun & Zhao, 2025
- Cobitis bilineata Canestrini, 1865
- Cobitis bilseli Battalgil, 1942 (Beyşehir spined loach)
- Cobitis biwae D. S. Jordan & Snyder, 1901
- Cobitis brachysoma Chen & Chen, 2018
- Cobitis brevifasciata (I. S. Kim & W. O. Lee, 1995)
- Cobitis brevipinna (Chen & Chen, 2017)
- Cobitis calderoni Băcescu, 1962
- Cobitis choii I. S. Kim & Y. M. Son, 1984 (Choi's spined loach)
- Cobitis crassicauda Y. X. Chen & Y. F. Chen, 2013
- Cobitis dalmatina S. L. Karaman, 1928
- Cobitis delicata Niwa, 1937
- Cobitis derzhavini Vasil’eva, Solovyeva, Levin & Vasil’ev, 2020
- Cobitis dolichorhynchus Nichols, 1918
- Cobitis dorademiri Erk' Akan, Özdemir & Özeren, 2017
- Cobitis elazigensis Coad & Sarıeyyüpoglu, 1988 (Tigris spined loach)
- Cobitis elongata Heckel & Kner, 1857
- Cobitis elongatoides Băcescu & R. F. Mayer, 1969
- Cobitis emrei Freyhof, Bayçelebi & Geiger, 2018
- Cobitis erkakanae Freyhof, Bayçelebi & Geiger, 2018
- Cobitis evreni Erk' Akan, Özeren & Nalbant, 2008 (Ceyhan spined loach)
- Cobitis fahireae Erk' Akan, Ekmekçi & Nalbant, 1998 (Küçük Menderes spined loach)
- Cobitis faridpaki Mousavi-Sabet, Vasil'eva, Vatandoust & Vasil'ev, 2011
- Cobitis fasciola Y. X. Chen & Y. F. Chen, 2013
- Cobitis feroniae Novaga, Bellucci, Geiger & Freyhof, 2024
- Cobitis fimbriata (Chen & Chen, 2017)
- Cobitis gladkovi Vasil'ev & Vasil'eva, 2008
- Cobitis gracilis Y. X. Chen & Y. F. Chen, 2016
- Cobitis haasi Klausewitz, 1955
- Cobitis hankugensis I. S. Kim, J. Y. Park, Y. M. Son & Nalbant, 2003
- Cobitis hellenica Economidis & Nalbant, 1996
- Cobitis hereromacula Y. X. Chen, X. Y. Sui, N. Liang & Y. F. Chen, 2015
- Cobitis herzegoviniensis Buj & Šanda, 2014
- Cobitis hugowolfeldi (Nalbant, 1993)
- Cobitis illyrica Freyhof & Stelbrink, 2007
- Cobitis indus Eagderi, Seçer & Freyhof, 2022
- Cobitis jadovaensis Mustafić & Mrakovčić, 2008
- Cobitis joergbohleni Freyhof, Bayçelebi & Geiger, 2018
- Cobitis kaibarai Nakajima, 2012
- Cobitis kellei Erk' Akan, Ekmekçi & Nalbant, 1998 (Göksu spined loach)
- Cobitis koreensis I. S. Kim, 1975
- Cobitis laoensis (Sauvage, 1878)
- Cobitis laterimaculata J. P. Yan & M. L. Zheng, 1984
- Cobitis lebedevi Vasil'eva & Vasil'ev, 1985
- Cobitis leptosoma Chen, Sui, He & Chen, 2015
- Cobitis levantina Krupp & Moubayed-Breil, 1992 (Orontes spined loach)
- Cobitis linea (Heckel, 1847)
- Cobitis longibarba (Y. F. Chen & Y. X. Chen, 2005)
- Cobitis longicorpus I. S. Kim, K. C. Choi & Nalbant, 1976
- Cobitis lutheri Rendahl (de), 1935 (Luther's spined loach)
- Cobitis macrostigma Dabry de Thiersant, 1872
- Cobitis magnostriata Nakajima, 2012
- Cobitis maroccana Pellegrin, 1929
- Cobitis matsubarae Okada & Ikeda, 1939
- Cobitis megaspila Nalbant, 1993
- Cobitis melanoleuca Nichols, 1925
- Cobitis mellaria Doadrio & Perea, 2023
- Cobitis meridionalis S. L. Karaman, 1924
- Cobitis microcephala Y. X. Chen & Y. F. Chen, 2011
- Cobitis minamorii Nakajima, 2012
- Cobitis minhi S. V. Ngô, 2008
- Cobitis monorus Endruweit, 2025
- Cobitis multifasciata Wakiya & T. Mori, 1929
- Cobitis multimaculata Y. X. Chen & Y. F. Chen, 2011
- Cobitis nalbanti Vasil'eva, D. M. Kim, Vasil'ev, M. H. Ko & Y. J. Won, 2016 (Nalbant's spined loach)
- Cobitis narentana S. L. Karaman, 1928
- Cobitis nigrolinea (Chen & Chen, 2017)
- Cobitis obtusirostra Chen, Sui, He & Chen, 2015
- Cobitis ohridana S. L. Karaman, 1928
- Cobitis pacifica I. S. Kim, J. Y. Park & Nalbant, 1999
- Cobitis paludica (F. de Buen, 1930)
- Cobitis petrtyli Endruweit, 2025
- Cobitis phrygica Battalgazi, 1944 (Acı spined loach)
- Cobitis pirii Freyhof, Bayçelebi & Geiger, 2018
- Cobitis pontica Vasil'eva & Vasil'ev, 2006 (Pontic spined loach)
- Cobitis pulchra Endruweit, 2025
- Cobitis pumila I. S. Kim & W. O. Lee, 1987 (Puan spined loach)
- Cobitis puncticulata Erk' Akan, Ekmekçi & Nalbant, 1998 (Spotted spined loach)
- Cobitis punctilineata Economidis & Nalbant, 1996
- Cobitis qujiangensis (Chen & Chen, 2017
- Cobitis rara J. X. Chen, 1981
- Cobitis sakahoko Nakajima & Suzawa, 2015
- Cobitis saniae Eagderi, Jouladeh-Roudbar, Jalili, Sayyadzadeh & Esmaeili, 2017
- Cobitis satunini Gladkov, 1935
- Cobitis shikokuensis Suzawa, 2006
- Cobitis sibirica Gladkov, 1935
- Cobitis simplicispina Hankó (hu), 1925 (Sakarya spined loach)
- Cobitis sinensis Sauvage & Dabry de Thiersant, 1874 (Siberian spined loach)
- Cobitis sipahilerae Erk' Akan, Özdemir & Özeren, 2017
- Cobitis splendens Erk' Akan, Ekmekçi & Nalbant, 1998 (Splendid spined loach)
- Cobitis squataeniata Ngô, 2008
- Cobitis stenocauda Y. X. Chen & Y. F. Chen, 2013
- Cobitis stephanidisi Economidis, 1992
- Cobitis striata Ikeda, 1936
- Cobitis strumicae S. L. Karaman, 1955 (Bulgarian spined loach)
- Cobitis taenia Linnaeus, 1758 (Spined loach)
- Cobitis takatsuensis Mizuno, 1970
- Cobitis takenoi Nakajima, 2016
- Cobitis tanaitica Băcescu & R. F. Mayer, 1969
- Cobitis taurica Vasil'eva, Vasil'ev, Janko, Ráb & Rábová, 2005
- Cobitis tetralineata I. S. Kim, J. Y. Park & Nalbant, 1999
- Cobitis tigrina (Zhang, Zhang, Chen & Zhang, 2025)
- Cobitis tosaensis Takahashi, 2026
- Cobitis trichonica Stephanidis, 1974
- Cobitis troasensis Freyhof, Bayçelebi & Geiger, 2018
- Cobitis turcica Hankó (hu), 1925 (Turkish spined loach)
- Cobitis vardarensis S. L. Karaman, 1928 (Vardar spined loach)
- Cobitis vettonica Doadrio & Perdices, 1997
- Cobitis xinjiangensis (Y. F. Chen & Y. X. Chen, 2005)
- Cobitis xui Tan, Li, Wu & Yang, 2019
- Cobitis ylengensis S. V. Ngô, 2003
- Cobitis yongdokensis (I. S. Kim & J. Y. Park, 1997)
- Cobitis zanandreai Cavicchioli, 1965
- Cobitis zhejiangensis Y. M. Son & S. P. He, 2005

Synonyms

- Cobitis damlae Erk' Akan & Özdemir, 2014 (Dalaman spined loach); valid as C. fahireae
