= Cobitis arachthosensis =

Conservation status
- Endangered (IUCN 3.1)

Scientific classification
- Kingdom: Animalia
- Phylum: Chordata
- Class: Actinopterygii
- Order: Cypriniformes
- Family: Cobitidae
- Genus: Cobitis
- Species: C. arachthosensis

Binomial name
- Cobitis arachthosensis Economidis & Nalbant, 1996

Species of fish

Cobitis arachthosensis is a species of ray-finned fish in the true loach family (Cobitidae). It is endemic to Greece.

It belongs to the subgenus Bicanestrinia, together with C. hellenica, C. meridionalis, and C. trichonica. According to cladistic analysis of DNA sequence data (nDNA RAG-1 and S7 ribosomal protein intron 1, and mtDNA cytochrome b), the first of these is an extremely close relative and the present species might arguably be included in it. C. hellenica occurs in the Louros and Thiamis River basins, parapatric to the range of C. arachthosensis.

Its natural habitats is the Arachthos River basin. It is threatened by habitat loss.
