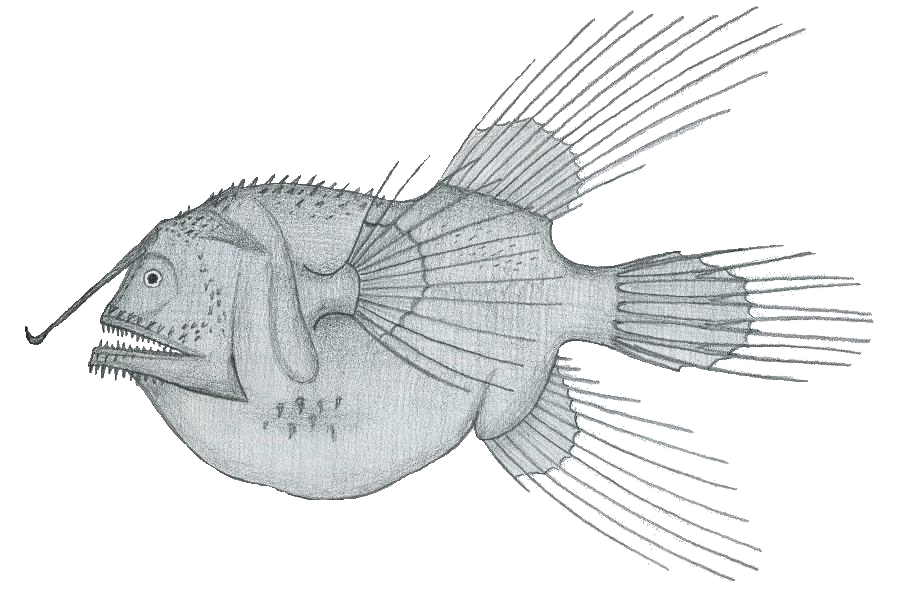

Conservation status
- Least Concern (IUCN 3.1)

Scientific classification
- Kingdom: Animalia
- Phylum: Chordata
- Class: Actinopterygii
- Division: Teleostei
- Order: Lophiiformes
- Family: Caulophrynidae
- Genus: Caulophryne
- Species: C. jordani

Binomial name
- Caulophryne jordani Goode & T. H. Bean, 1896

Synonyms
- Ceratocaulophryne regani Roule & Angel, 1932; Caulophryne setosus Goode & T. H. Bean, 1896

= Caulophryne jordani =

Species of fish

Caulophryne jordani, or the fanfin angler, is a species of marine ray-finned fish belonging to the family Caulophrynidae, the fanfins. This species is a deepwater species which is found in Oceanic waters around the world. Like other deepwater anglerfishes it shows extreme sexual dimorphism with the males being much smaller than the females and acting as sexual parasites of the females.

== Taxonomy ==
Caulophryne jordani was first formally described in 1896 by the American ichthyologists George Brown Goode and Tarleton Hoffman Bean with its type locality given as the Gulf Stream off Long Island, New York at 39°27'N, 71°15'W, Albatross station 2747 from a depth between 0 and 1,276 fathoms (0 and 7,656 ft; 0 and 2,334 m). When Goode and Bean described the species they placed it in a new monospecific genus, Caulophryne, so this species is the type species of that genus by monotypy. Caulophryne is one of two genera within the family Caulophrynidae. The 5th edition of Fishes of the World classifies the Caulophrynidae within the suborder Ceratioidei of the order Lophiiformes, the anglerfishes.

== Etymology ==
Caulophryne jordani is a species within the genus Caulophryne, a combination of caulis "stem", an allusion to the stem-like base of the illicium, and phryne "toad", a suffix commonly used in the names of anglerfish genera. Its use may date as far back as Aristotle and Cicero, who referred to anglerfishes as "fishing-frogs" and "sea-frogs", respectively, possibly because of a physical resemblance. The specific name honours the American ichthyologist, educator, and eugenicist David Starr Jordan, the president of Stanford University in California, in recognition of his work in the field of ichthyology.

== Description ==
Like all deep-sea anglerfish, Caulophryne jordani has a high degree of sexual dimorphism. The females have short, round bodies with large mouths. The lower jaw reaches back past the base of the pectoral fin. The teeth in the jaws are thin, backwards curving and depressible. The morphology of the esca and illicium distinguish C. jordani from its congeners; the illicium in this species, which ranges between 16.8% and 36.8% of the standard length, is pigmented apart from the area near the esca. There are between 5 and 14 elongated translucent filaments along the whole length of the illicium, all of these except for the ones nearest the esca have their origin on the rear margin of the illicium. The relatively simple esca (the lure, which lacks a bulb) has a long, filamentous appendage arising from its side towards the front, two appendages on its tip which each have many filaments, thicker toward the front of the appendage and thinner towards the rear. These filaments are opaque along the rear margin and the rearmost are the thinnest. The appendage on the side of the esca near its front has many short filaments and has a palmate and opaque tip.

The females have highly elongated dorsal and anal fins, with the soft rays of these fins resembling long threads. There are 8 fin rays in the caudal fin, between 16 and 19 rays in the dorsal fin, and between 14 and 18 rays in the anal fin. They do not have pelvic fins post-metamorphosis, as typical for the suborder. The sensory cells of the lateral line system are at the tips of the filamentous rays of the dorsal and anal fins. The skin is naked and they do not have any dermal spines. The maximum published total length for the females is 20 cm (7.9 in).

The males are much smaller than the females, being 1.6 cm (0.63 in) in total length, and have more elongated bodies. They have large eyes and large nostrils, with large olfactory receptors. They have no teeth in the jaws, although there are tooth-like structures (denticles) on the jaw bones at the very front of the jaws which are used to attach to the larger female. The male do not have elongated dorsal and anal fins but have large pectoral fins like the females.

== Distribution and habitat ==
Caulophryne jordani has a circumglobal distribution, although most records come from the Eastern Atlantic Ocean, Southern Ocean and the Indo-Pacific region. It is a bathypelagic species that has been recorded at depths between 100 and 1,510 m (330 and 4,950 ft).

== Biology ==
Caulophryne jordani is a predator on other fishes. They reproduce by means of pelagic eggs which hatch into pelagic larvae. The short, rounded larvae have swollen skin and well-developed pectoral and pelvic fins, the pelvic fins being lost as they metamorphose. Both larval males and females have a basic illicium. Metamorphosis starts at a standard length of 8 to 10 mm (0.31 to 0.39 in). The large, well-developed eyes and olfactory apparatus of the metamorphosed males are used to detect and home in on a species specific chemical released by the female to attract males. When the male finds a female he bites her and the tissue and circulatory systems of the pair may fuse; if fusion occurs he becomes a sexual parasite on the female and is nourished by her through shared blood. For the remainder of his life he may remain attached to the female and fertilises her eggs. The genus as a whole is thought to practice facultative sexual parasitism as specimens of C. jordani have well developed ovaries despite lacking attached males; in species which exclusively practice sexual parasitism, both sexes mature (and gonads ripen) only after fusion is achieved. This genus may be limited to one male attached at a time per female, but more evidence is needed to conclusively determine this assumption.

A pair of C. jordani was observed in situ by a submersible of the Rebikoff-Niggeler Foundation in 2018, which was the first time this species was observed alive. The extended fin rays were observed to billow all around the female, adorned with pinpoints of bioluminescence. It is thought that these filamentous rays, each independently controlled by muscles at the base, fulfill a similar role to a cat's whiskers, acting as a "network of sensory antennae, a kind of sphere of tactility around the fish", which would allow the female to detect nearby prey items. The bioluminescence on the fin rays is speculated to be mimicry of a larger or unpalatable organism, such as a jellyfish with stinging tentacles. Alternatively, they may supplement the illicium in luring prey closer.
