= Nannastacus =

Scientific classification
- Domain: Eukaryota
- Kingdom: Animalia
- Phylum: Arthropoda
- Class: Malacostraca
- Order: Cumacea
- Family: Nannastacidae
- Genus: Nannastacus; Bate, 1865

Species
- See text

Genus of crustaceans

Nannastacus is a genus of crustaceans in the order Cumacea. It contains the following species:

- Nannastacus agnatus Calman, 1911
- Nannastacus angulifera Lomakina, 1967
- Nannastacus asper Hale, 1945
- Nannastacus brevicaudatus Calman, 1905
- Nannastacus erinaceus Zimmer, 1913
- Nannastacus euxinicus Băcescu, 1951
- Nannastacus gamoi Băcescu, 1992
- Nannastacus georgi Stebbing, 1900
- Nannastacus gibbosus Calman, 1911
- Nannastacus goniatus Gamo, 1962
- Nannastacus gurneyi
- Nannastacus inconstans Hale, 1945
- Nannastacus inflatus Hale, 1945
- Nannastacus johnstoni Hale, 1945
- Nannastacus lima (Hale, 1936)
- Nannastacus longirostris G. O. Sars, 1879
- Nannastacus minor Calman, 1911
- Nannastacus muelleri Petrescu, 1997
- Nannastacus mystacinus Zimmer, 1921
- Nannastacus nyctagineus Gamo, 1962
- Nannastacus occidentalis Băcescu & Muradian, 1975
- Nannastacus ossiani Stebbing, 1900
- Nannastacus pardus Calman, 1905
- Nannastacus parvulus Băcescu & Muradian, 1975
- Nannastacus pectinatus Gamo, 1962
- Nannastacus pruinosus Gamo, 1962
- Nannastacus reptans Calman, 1911
- Nannastacus sauteri Zimmer, 1921
- Nannastacus spinosus (Paulson, 1875)
- Nannastacus spinulosus Gamo, 1962
- Nannastacus stebbingi Calman, 1904
- Nannastacus subinflatus Hale, 1945
- Nannastacus suhmi Sars, 1886
- Nannastacus tardus Calman, 1911
- Nannastacus turcicus Băcescu, 1982
- Nannastacus umbellulifer Gamo, 1963
- Nannastacus unguiculatus (Bate, 1859)
- Nannastacus wisseni Petrescu, 1997
- Nannastacus zimmeri Calman, 1911
