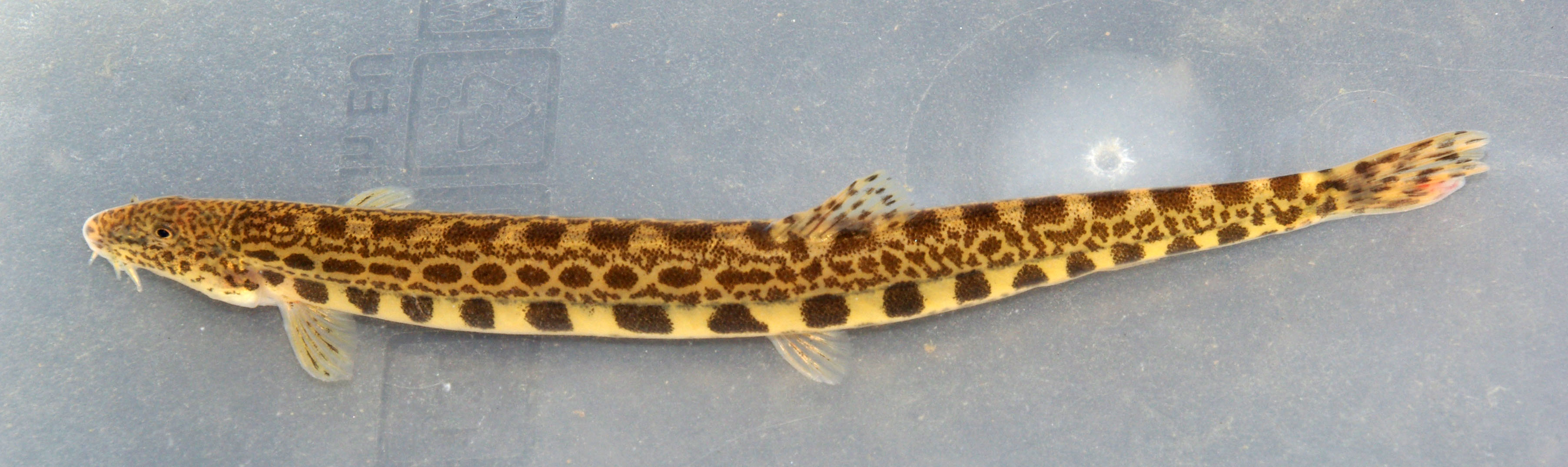

Conservation status
- Vulnerable (IUCN 3.1)

Scientific classification
- Kingdom: Animalia
- Phylum: Chordata
- Class: Actinopterygii
- Order: Cypriniformes
- Family: Cobitidae
- Genus: Cobitis
- Species: C. calderoni

Binomial name
- Cobitis calderoni Băcescu, 1962
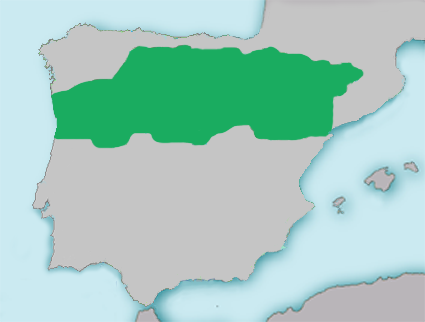

= Cobitis calderoni =

Species of fish

Cobitis calderoni is a species of ray-finned fish in the family Cobitidae. It is found in Portugal and Spain. Its natural habitat is rivers. It is threatened by habitat loss.

== Etymology ==
The fish is named in honor of Enrique C. Calderón, who was the chief engineer, at the Station Centrale d'Hydrobiologie de Madrid, who collected the holotype specimen.
