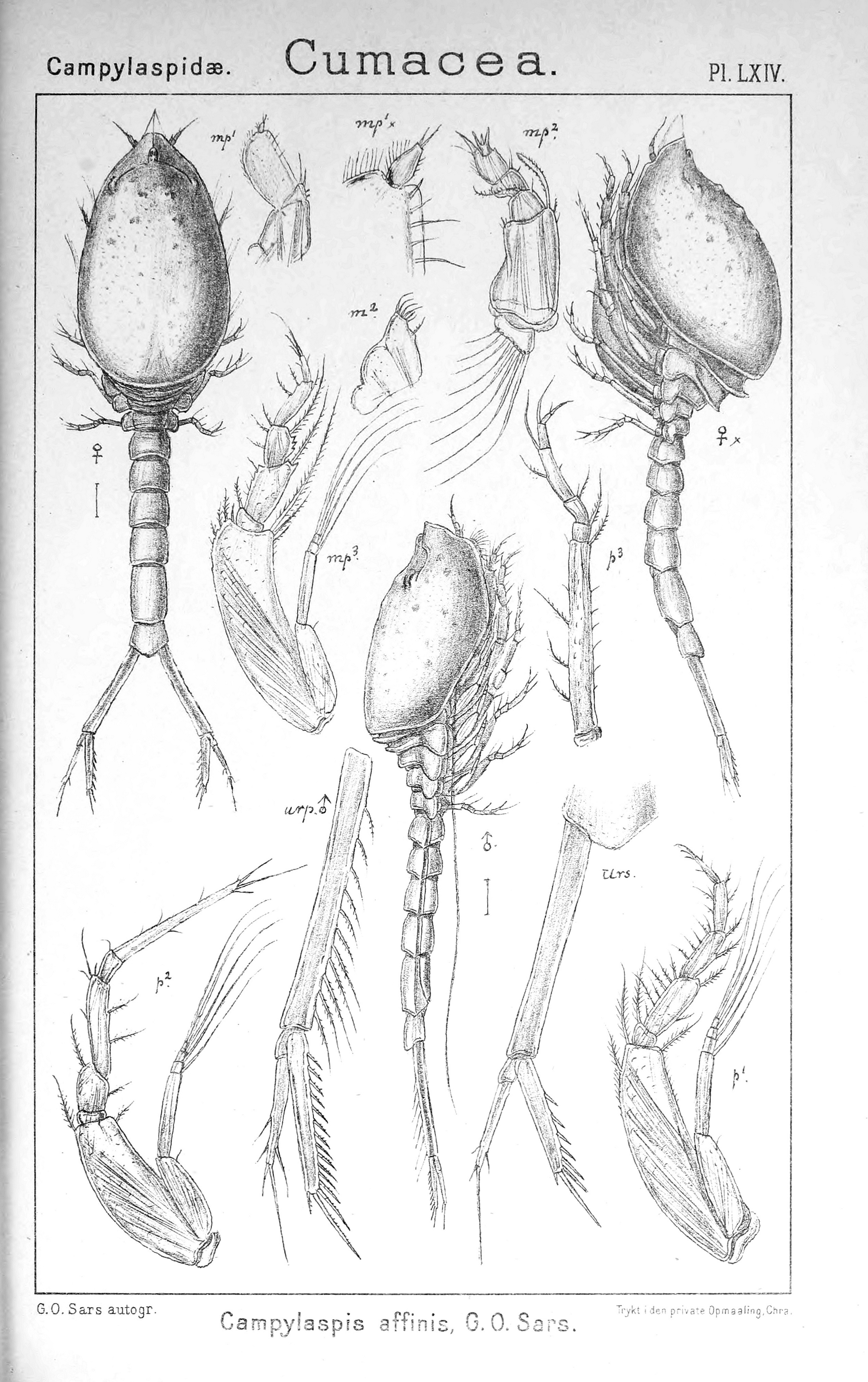
- Campylaspis affinis

Scientific classification
- Domain: Eukaryota
- Kingdom: Animalia
- Phylum: Arthropoda
- Class: Malacostraca
- Order: Cumacea
- Family: Nannastacidae
- Genus: Campylaspis; G. O. Sars, 1865

Type species
- Cuma rubicunda Liljeborg, 1855

= Campylaspis =

Genus of crustaceans

Campylaspis is a genus of crustaceans in the order Cumacea. Species of Campylaspis have a "bulky" carapace, which makes up more than 40% of the animal's length, as well as distinctive features of the mouthparts. There are currently 170 recognised described species:

- Campylaspis aculeata Jones, 1974
- Campylaspis aegypta Mühlenhardt-Siegel, 2009
- Campylaspis affinis Sars, 1870
- Campylaspis africana Băcescu & Maradian, 1972
- Campylaspis akabensis Băcescu & Muradian, 1975
- Campylaspis akymata Muhlenhardt-Siegel, 2005
- Campylaspis alba Hansen, 1920
- Campylaspis alisae Corbera, 2008
- Campylaspis alveolata Muradian, 1976
- Campylaspis amblyoda Gamo, 1960
- Campylaspis anae Petrescu, 2006
- Campylaspis angelae Petrescu, 2006
- Campylaspis angularis Gamo, 1960
- Campylaspis antarctica Calman, 1907
- Campylaspis antipai Băcescu & Petrescu, 1989
- Campylaspis aperta Lomakina, 1958
- Campylaspis apheles Gerken, 2012
- Campylaspis arcuata Jones, 1974
- Campylaspis aspera Hale, 1945
- Campylaspis aulacoeis Le Loeuff & Intes, 1972
- Campylaspis australiensis Petrescu, 2006
- Campylaspis bacescui Muradian, 1976
- Campylaspis bicarinata Jones, 1974
- Campylaspis biplicata Watling & McCann, 1996
- Campylaspis bituberculata Gerken, 2012
- Campylaspis blakei Watling & McCann, 1996
- Campylaspis bonetti Băcescu & Maradian, 1972
- Campylaspis brasilianus Băcescu & Petrescu, 1989
- Campylaspis brevicornis Jones, 1974
- Campylaspis breviramis Ledoyer, 1993
- Campylaspis bulbosa Jones, 1974
- Campylaspis canaliculata Zimmer, 1936
- Campylaspis caperata Jones, 1974
- Campylaspis caribbeana Petrescu, 2002
- Campylaspis clavata Lomakina, 1952
- Campylaspis cognata Jones, 1974
- Campylaspis costata (Sars, 1865)
- Campylaspis cousteaui Petrescu, 1990
- Campylaspis crispa Lomakina, 1955
- Campylaspis depressa Ledoyer, 1988
- Campylaspis echinata Hale, 1945
- Campylaspis edenensis Petrescu, 2006
- Campylaspis exarata Jones, 1974
- Campylaspis excavata Ledoyer, 1993
- Campylaspis frigida Hansen, 1908
- Campylaspis fusiformis Gamo, 1960
- Campylaspis gamoi Jones, 1984
- Campylaspis glabra Sars, 1878
- Campylaspis glebulosa Jones, 1974
- Campylaspis globosa Hansen, 1920
- Campylaspis gloriosae Ledoyer, 1988
- Campylaspis granulata Gamo, 1960
- Campylaspis grossui Petrescu, 2006
- Campylaspis guttata Jones, 1974
- Campylaspis halei Petrescu, 2006
- Campylaspis hartae Lie, 1969
- Campylaspis hatchae Gerken, 2012
- Campylaspis heardi Muradian-Ciamician, 1980
- Campylaspis heterotuberculata Corbera, 2000
- Campylaspis hirsuta Petrescu, 2006
- Campylaspis holthuisi Băcescu & Petrescu, 1989
- Campylaspis horrida Sars, 1870
- Campylaspis horridoides Stephensen, 1915
- Campylaspis inornata Jones, 1969
- Campylaspis intermedia Hansen, 1920
- Campylaspis johnstoni Hale, 1937
- Campylaspis jonesi Băcescu & Maradian, 1972
- Campylaspis kiiensis Gamo, 1960
- Campylaspis laevigata Jones, 1974
- Campylaspis laticarpa Hansen, 1920
- Campylaspis latidactyla Hale, 1945
- Campylaspis latimera Petrescu, 2006
- Campylaspis latipes Ledoyer, 1988
- Campylaspis ledoyeri Petrescu & Wittman, 2003
- Campylaspis legendrei Fage, 1951
- Campylaspis longidentata Petrescu, 2006
- Campylaspis lynseyae Petrescu, 2006
- Campylaspis macrophthalma Sars, 1878
- Campylaspis macrosulcata Gerken, 2012
- Campylaspis maculata Zimmer, 1907
- Campylaspis maculinodulosa Watlin & McCann, 1996
- Campylaspis mansa Jones, 1974
- Campylaspis mauritanica Băcescu & Maradian, 1972
- Campylaspis menziesi Muradian, 1979
- Campylaspis microdentata Ledoyer, 1988
- Campylaspis microsulcata Gerken, 2012
- Campylaspis millsae Gerken, 2012
- Campylaspis minor Hale, 1945
- Campylaspis minuta Radhadevi & Kurian, 1989
- Campylaspis mozambica Ledoyer, 1988
- Campylaspis multinodosa Jones, 1974
- Campylaspis nemoi Muhlenhardt-Siegel, 2000
- Campylaspis nitens Bonnier, 1896
- Campylaspis nodulosa Sars, 1886
- Campylaspis normani Gerken, 2012
- Campylaspis nowrae Petrescu, 2006
- Campylaspis nuda Jones, 1974
- Campylaspis orientalis Calman, 1911
- Campylaspis ovalis Stebbing, 1912
- Campylaspis pacifica Sars, 1886
- Campylaspis paeneglabra Stebbing, 1912
- Campylaspis papillata Lomakina, 1952
- Campylaspis paucinodosa Jones, 1974
- Campylaspis pileus Foxon, 1932
- Campylaspis pilosa Jones, 1974
- Campylaspis pisum Vassilenko & Tzareva, 2004
- Campylaspis platyuropus Calman, 1911
- Campylaspis plicata Jones, 1974
- Campylaspis poorei Petrescu, 2006
- Campylaspis porcata Jones, 1974
- Campylaspis propinqua Jones, 1974
- Campylaspis pseudosquamifera Ledoyer, 1988
- Campylaspis pulchella Sars, 1873
- Campylaspis pumila Gamo, 1960
- Campylaspis pustulosa Hale, 1945
- Campylaspis quadridentata Ledoyer, 1993
- Campylaspis quadriplicata Lomakina, 1968
- Campylaspis rectangulata Petrescu, 2006
- Campylaspis redacta Jones, 1974
- Campylaspis reticulata Gamo, 1960
- Campylaspis rex Gerken & Ryder, 2002
- Campylaspis roscida Hale, 1945
- Campylaspis rostellata Jones, 1974
- Campylaspis rostrata Calman, 1905
- Campylaspis rubicunda (Liljeborg, 1855)
- Campylaspis rubromaculata Lie, 1969
- Campylaspis rufa Hart, 1930
- Campylaspis rufus Gerken, 2012
- Campylaspis rupta Hale, 1945
- Campylaspis sagamiensis Gamo, 1967
- Campylaspis schnabelae Gerken, 2012
- Campylaspis sculpta Petrescu, 2006
- Campylaspis sculptaspinosa Gerken, 2012
- Campylaspis scuta Jones, 1984
- Campylaspis selvakumarani (Băcescu & Muradian, 1974)
- Campylaspis serrata Petrescu, 2006
- Campylaspis serratipes Hansen, 1920
- Campylaspis setifera Petrescu, 2006
- Campylaspis similis Hale, 1945
- Campylaspis sinuosa Gamo, 1960
- Campylaspis spinifera Petrescu, 2006
- Campylaspis spinosa Calman, 1906
- Campylaspis squamifera Fage, 1929
- Campylaspis stephenseni Just, 1970
- Campylaspis sticta Jones, 1974
- Campylaspis striata Gamo, 1960
- Campylaspis submersa Jones, 1974
- Campylaspis sulcata Sars, 1870
- Campylaspis tasmaniensis Petrescu, 2006
- Campylaspis thetidis Hale, 1945
- Campylaspis thompsoni Hale, 1945
- Campylaspis totzkei Muhlenhardt-Siegel, 2000
- Campylaspis triplicata Hale, 1945
- Campylaspis trisulcata Petrescu, 2006
- Campylaspis tuberculata Muradian, 1976
- Campylaspis tubulata Fage, 1945
- Campylaspis tumulifera Jones, 1984
- Campylaspis umbensis Gurwitch, 1939
- Campylaspis undata Sars, 1864
- Campylaspis uniplicata Hale, 1945
- Campylaspis unisulcata Hale, 1945
- Campylaspis urodentata Ledoyer, 1988
- Campylaspis valida Jones, 1984
- Campylaspis valleculata Jones, 1974
- Campylaspis vemae Muradian, 1979
- Campylaspis verrucosa Sars, 1866
- Campylaspis vitrea Calman, 1906
- Campylaspis wardi Băcescu, 1991
- Campylaspis zealandiaensis Gerken, 2012
- Campylaspis zimmeri Gerken, 2012
