= Cobitis strumicae =

Conservation status
- Least Concern (IUCN 3.1)

Scientific classification
- Kingdom: Animalia
- Phylum: Chordata
- Class: Actinopterygii
- Order: Cypriniformes
- Family: Cobitidae
- Genus: Cobitis
- Species: C. strumicae

Binomial name
- Cobitis strumicae S. L. Karaman, 1955

Species of fish

Cobitis strumicae is a species of ray-finned fish in the family Cobitidae. It is found in Bulgaria and Greece.
