= Jules Richard =

Jules Richard may refer to:

- Jules Richard (mathematician)
- Jules Richard (oceanographer)
- Jules Richard (photographer)
