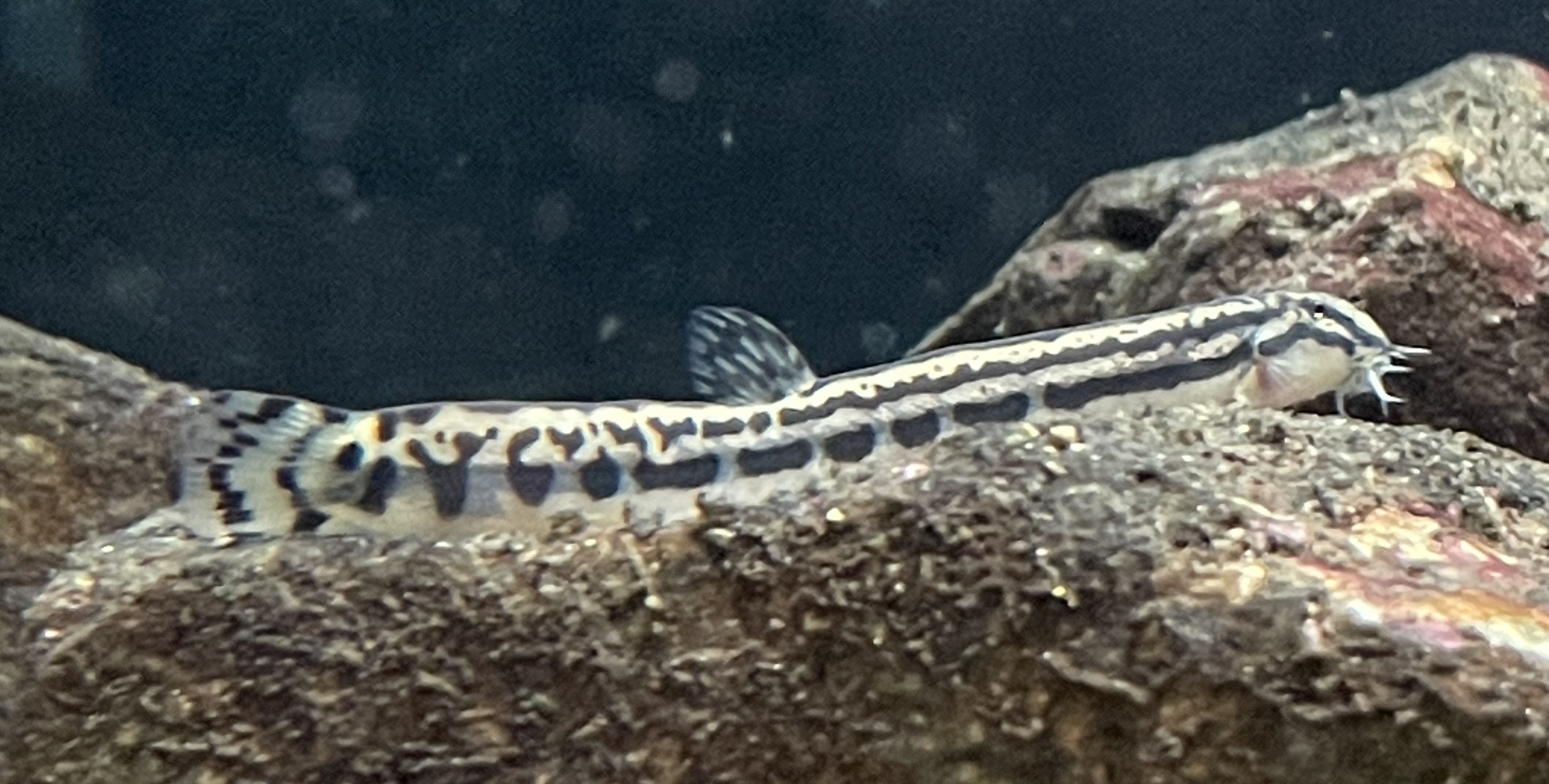

Conservation status
- Near Threatened (IUCN 3.1)

Scientific classification
- Kingdom: Animalia
- Phylum: Chordata
- Class: Actinopterygii
- Order: Cypriniformes
- Family: Cobitidae
- Genus: Cobitis
- Species: C. takatsuensis

Binomial name
- Cobitis takatsuensis Mizuno, 1970

= Cobitis takatsuensis =

Species of fish

Cobitis takatsuensis is a species of fish in the family Cobitidae. It is found in Japan.

== Description ==
This species reaches a length of 6.7 cm (2.6 in).
