= Cobitis minamorii =

Conservation status
- Near Threatened (IUCN 3.1)

Scientific classification
- Kingdom: Animalia
- Phylum: Chordata
- Class: Actinopterygii
- Order: Cypriniformes
- Family: Cobitidae
- Genus: Cobitis
- Species: C. minamorii

Binomial name
- Cobitis minamorii Nakajima, 2012

Species of fish

Cobitis minamorii is a species of fish in the family Cobitidae found in Honshu, Japan. Five subspecies have been proposed. Japanese name is kogata-suji-shima-dojyô. English name is Small stripe spined loach. This species is listed as a new species in 2012.

They inhabit sandy-mud bottoms of the lower reach of rivers and small lowland stream. The number of current population is decreasing because these habitable environment is decreasing. They are found in western Honshu:Okayama, Shimane, Tottori, Hiroshima, Hyogo, Osaka, Kyoto, Shiga, Mie, Gihu, Aichi, Shizuoka.

Their spawning season is May-August. They invade a temporary wetland such as rice field and lay eggs at the bottom of the mud. These eggs hatch during one day. They mature in one year and live in approximately 3-5 years under breeding. They grow up to 10 cm in total length. Minamorii, their specific name, comes from Japanese researcher who study speciation of Japanese loaches first.

== Subspecies ==
There are currently 5 recognized subspecies:

- Cobitis minamorii minamorii Nakajima, 2012
- Cobitis minamorii oumiensis Nakajima, 2012
- Cobitis minamorii saninensis Nakajima, 2012
- Cobitis minamorii tokaiensis Nakajima, 2012
- Cobitis minamorii yodoensis Nakajima, 2012
