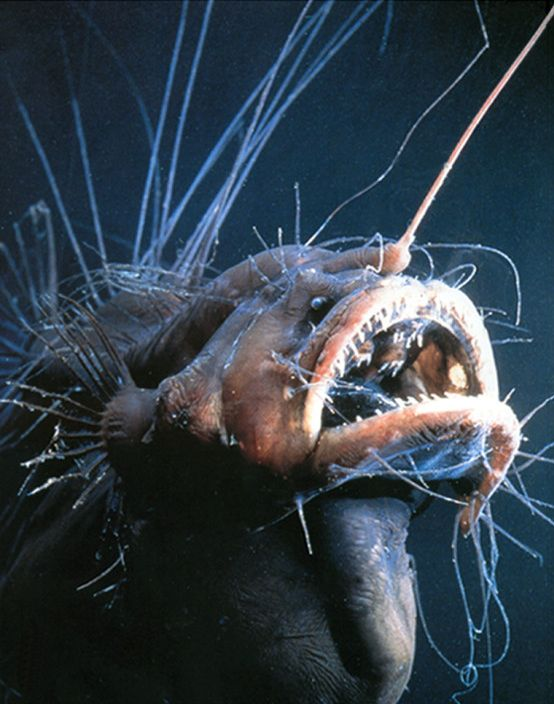
- Caulophryne pelagica

Scientific classification
- Kingdom: Animalia
- Phylum: Chordata
- Class: Actinopterygii
- Order: Lophiiformes
- Family: Caulophrynidae
- Genus: Caulophryne; Goode & T. H. Bean, 1896

Type species
- Caulophryne jordani Goode & T. H. Bean, 1896

Synonyms
- Ceratocaulophryne Roule & Angel, 1932

= Caulophryne =

Genus of fishes

Caulophryne is a genus of marine ray-finned fishes belonging to the family Caulophrynidae, the fanfins or hairy anglerfishes. These fishes are found throughout the non-polar oceans of the world.

== Taxonomy ==
Caulophryne was first proposed as monospecific genus in 1896 by the American ichthyologists George Brown Goode and Tarleton Hoffman Bean when the described Caulophryne jordani. The holotype of C. jordani was collected from the Gulf Stream off Long Island, New York at 39°27'N, 71°15'W, Albatross station 2747 from a depth between 0 and 1,276 fathoms (0 and 7,656 ft; 0 and 2,334 m). Caulophryne and Robia are the two genera making up the family Caulophrynidae. The 5th edition of Fishes of the World classifies the Caulophrynidae within the suborder Ceratioidei of the order Lophiiformes, the anglerfishes.

== Etymology ==
Caulophryne is a combination of caulis "stem", an allusion to the stem-like base of the illicium, and phryne "toad", a suffix commonly used in the names of anglerfish genera. Its use may date as far back as Aristotle and Cicero, who referred to anglerfishes as "fishing-frogs" and "sea-frogs", respectively, possibly because of a physical resemblance.

== Species ==
Caulophryne currently has four recognized species classified within it:

Species	Image
Caulophryne bacescui Mihai-Bardan, 1982	
Caulophryne jordani Goode & T. H. Bean, 1896 (Fanfin angler)	
Caulophryne pelagica A. B. Brauer, 1902	
Caulophryne polynema Regan, 1930 (Hairy angler)	

== Characteristics ==
Caulophryne fanfins have a high degree of sexual dimorphism, akin to other anglerfish. The females have short, round bodies with large mouths. The lower jaw reaches back past the base of the pectoral fin. The teeth in the jaws are thin, backwards curving and depressible. They have highly elongated dorsal and anal fins, with the soft rays of these fins resembling long threads. There are 8 fin rays in the caudal fin. They do not have pelvic fins. The sensory cells of the lateral line system are at the tips of the filamentous rays of the dorsal and anal fins. They have a simple esca, or lure, which lacks a bulb but which may have filaments or appendages. The skin is naked and they do not have any dermal spines. The males are much smaller than the females and have more elongated bodies. They have large eyes and large nostrils, with large olfactory receptors. They have no teeth in the jaws, although there are tooth-like structures on the jaw bones which are used to attach to the larger female. The male do not have elongated dorsal and anal fins but so have large pectoral fins. The juveniles have pelvic fins that are lost when they metamorphose into adults, although the relict pelvic bones are retained. This genus differs from Robia in their markedly shorter illicium which measures approximately 130 mm (5.1 in) as opposed to around 270 mm (11 in) in Robia. The two genera also differ by the count and length of the fin rays in the dorsal and anal fins; Caulophryne possesses between 14 and 22 rays in the dorsal fin with the longest ray being 70% of the fish's standard length; in the anal fin there are between 12 and 19 fin rays with the longest being 60% of standard length. In Robia there are 6 rays in the dorsal fin, the longest is 65% of the standard length, and 5 rays in the anal fin with the longest being 40% of the standard length. The largest species in the genus is C. polynema with a maximum published total length of 21 cm (8.3 in).

== Distribution and habitat ==
Caulophryne fanfins are found in the Atlantic, Indian and Pacific Oceans where they live in the bathypelagic zone.

== Biology ==
Caulophryne fanfins are predators on other fishes. They reproduce by means of pelagic eggs which hatch into pelagic larvae. The short, rounded larvae have swollen skin and well-developed pectoral and pelvic fins, the pelvic fins being lost as they metamorphose. Both larval males and females have a basic illicium. Metamorphosis starts at a standard length of 8 to 10 mm (0.31 to 0.39 in). The large, well-developed eyes and olfactory apparatus of the metamorphosed males are used to detect and home in on a species-specific chemical released by the female to attract males. When the male finds a female he bites her and the tissue and circulatory systems of the pair fuse, he becomes a sexual parasite on the female and is nourished by the female through shared blood. For the remainder of his life he is attached to the female and fertilises her eggs. A pair of C. jordani was observed in-situ by a submersible of the Rebikoff-Niggeler Foundation in 2018, which was the first time this genus was observed alive. The extended fin rays were observed to spread all around the female, each independently controlled by muscle, and pinpointed with bioluminescence. It is thought that these filaments fulfill a similar role as a cat's whiskers, acting as a "network of sensory antennae, a kind of sphere of tactility around the fish", which would allow the female to detect nearby prey items. The bioluminescence on the rays is speculated to be mimicry of a larger or unpalatable organism, such as a jellyfish with stinging tentacles. Alternatively, they may supplement the ilicium in luring prey closer.
