= Cobitis elongata =

Conservation status
- Least Concern (IUCN 3.1)

Scientific classification
- Kingdom: Animalia
- Phylum: Chordata
- Class: Actinopterygii
- Division: Teleostei
- Order: Cypriniformes
- Family: Cobitidae
- Genus: Cobitis
- Species: C. elongata

Binomial name
- Cobitis elongata Heckel & Kner, 1858

Species of fish

Cobitis elongata (Balkan loach) is a species of ray-finned fish in the family Cobitidae. It is found in Austria, Bosnia and Herzegovina, Bulgaria, Croatia, Hungary, Romania, Serbia and Montenegro, Slovenia, and Turkey.

In the most recent (2008) assessment, the IUCN Red List of Threatened Species lists the Balkan loach's status as "least concern".
