= Cobitis megaspila =

Conservation status
- Data Deficient (IUCN 2.3)

Scientific classification
- Domain: Eukaryota
- Kingdom: Animalia
- Phylum: Chordata
- Class: Actinopterygii
- Order: Cypriniformes
- Family: Cobitidae
- Genus: Cobitis
- Species: C. megaspila

Binomial name
- Cobitis megaspila Nalbant, 1993

Species of fish

Cobitis megaspila is a species of ray-finned fish in the family Cobitidae. It is found in Moldova, Romania and Bulgaria.

== Taxonomic note ==
This species is now considered to be a jr. synonym of Cobitis elongatoides.
