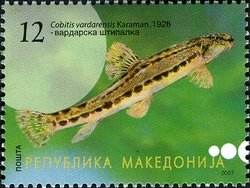
- On a postage stamp of North Macedonia

Conservation status
- Least Concern (IUCN 3.1)

Scientific classification
- Kingdom: Animalia
- Phylum: Chordata
- Class: Actinopterygii
- Order: Cypriniformes
- Family: Cobitidae
- Genus: Cobitis
- Species: C. vardarensis

Binomial name
- Cobitis vardarensis S. L. Karaman, 1928

= Cobitis vardarensis =

Species of fish

Cobitis vardarensis, the Vardar spined loach, is a species of ray-finned fish in the true loach family Cobitidae.

== Environment ==
Cobitis vardarensis is recorded to be found in a freshwater environment within a demersal depth range. This species lives in brackish waters. It is also native to a subtropical climate.

== Size ==
Cobitis vardarensis can reach the maximum length of about 11 centimeters or about 4.33 inches as an unsexed male.

== Distribution ==
Cobitis vardarensis is recorded to be found in Europe, the Aegean Sea basin, Pinios to Gallikos drainages, Greece, and North Macedonia, and named for the Vardar river.

== Biology ==
Its status is insufficiently known. Cobitis vardarens is found in still waters of lakes, oxbows, and backwaters on mud to silt bottoms that are rarely in moving or flowing water. This species is also known to occur in marshlands, lowland rivers with little current, springs and associated wetlands. During its period of breeding, this species is recorded to have distinct pairing.

== Population ==
The population of this species is known to be very abundant. This species is recorded to be of least concern for becoming an endangered species.

== Threats ==
Cobitis vardarensis is threatened by water abstraction and pollution.

== Classification ==
The taxonomic classification of Cobitis vardarensis is as follows:

- Kingdom : Animalia
- Phylum : Chordata
- Subphylum : Vertebrata
- Superclass : Gnathostomata
- Class : Actinopterygii
- Order : Cypriniformes
- Family : Cobitidae
- Genus : Cobitis
- Species : Cobitis vardarensis
