= Cobitis brevifasciata =

Conservation status
- Vulnerable (IUCN 3.1)

Scientific classification
- Kingdom: Animalia
- Phylum: Chordata
- Class: Actinopterygii
- Order: Cypriniformes
- Family: Cobitidae
- Genus: Cobitis
- Species: C. brevifasciata

Binomial name
- Cobitis brevifasciata (I. S. Kim & W. O. Lee, 1995)

Synonyms
- Niwaella brevifasciata Kim & Lee, 1995; Kichulchoia brevifasciata: Kim, Park & Nalbant, 1999

Species of fish

Cobitis brevifasciata is a vulnerable species of loach endemic to the Korean Peninsula.
