= Cobitis stephanidisi =

Conservation status
- Endangered (IUCN 3.1)

Scientific classification
- Kingdom: Animalia
- Phylum: Chordata
- Class: Actinopterygii
- Order: Cypriniformes
- Family: Cobitidae
- Genus: Cobitis
- Species: C. stephanidisi

Binomial name
- Cobitis stephanidisi Economidis, 1992

Species of fish

Cobitis stephanidisi is a species of ray-finned fish in the family Cobitidae. It is found only in Greece. Its natural habitat is freshwater springs. It is threatened by habitat loss.
