= Cobitis turcica =

Conservation status
- Endangered (IUCN 3.1)

Scientific classification
- Kingdom: Animalia
- Phylum: Chordata
- Class: Actinopterygii
- Order: Cypriniformes
- Family: Cobitidae
- Genus: Cobitis
- Species: C. turcica

Binomial name
- Cobitis turcica Hankó, 1925

Species of fish

Cobitis turcica is a species of ray-finned fish in the family Cobitidae. It is found only in Turkey. Its natural habitats are rivers, freshwater lakes, and freshwater marshes. It is threatened by habitat loss.
