= Cobitis puncticulata =

Conservation status
- Endangered (IUCN 3.1)

Scientific classification
- Kingdom: Animalia
- Phylum: Chordata
- Class: Actinopterygii
- Order: Cypriniformes
- Family: Cobitidae
- Genus: Cobitis
- Species: C. puncticulata

Binomial name
- Cobitis puncticulata Erk'akan, Atalay-Ekmekçi & Nalbant, 1998

Species of fish

Cobitis puncticulata is a species of ray-finned fish in the family Cobitidae. It is found only in Turkey and Greece. Its natural habitat is rivers. It is threatened by habitat loss.
