= Cobitis punctilineata =

Conservation status
- Endangered (IUCN 3.1)

Scientific classification
- Kingdom: Animalia
- Phylum: Chordata
- Class: Actinopterygii
- Order: Cypriniformes
- Family: Cobitidae
- Genus: Cobitis
- Species: C. punctilineata

Binomial name
- Cobitis punctilineata Economidis & Nalbant, 1996

Species of fish

Cobitis punctilineata is a species of ray-finned fish in the family Cobitidae. It is found only in Greece. Its natural habitats are rivers and intermittent rivers. It is threatened by habitat loss.
