= Cobitis maroccana =

Conservation status
- Least Concern (IUCN 3.1)

Scientific classification
- Kingdom: Animalia
- Phylum: Chordata
- Class: Actinopterygii
- Order: Cypriniformes
- Family: Cobitidae
- Genus: Cobitis
- Species: C. maroccana

Binomial name
- Cobitis maroccana Pellegrin, 1929

Synonyms
- Cobitis marrocana Pellegrin, 1929 [orth. error]

Species of fish

Cobitis maroccana is a species of ray-finned fish in the family Cobitidae.

== Biology ==
Cobitis marrocana is now recorded to be least concern. It now has a competitor species called Lepomis spp. The competition has created a decline in the population of Cobitis marrocana. Another negative influence that could affect the population as well is the effect of pollution on the habitat of Cobitis marrocana.

== Size ==
The average size of an unsexed male is about 8 centimeters.

== Location ==
It is found only in Morocco and Spain. It is known to be common to the rivers of Loukkos and Sebou, and it is also found in the Atlantic coast of northern Morocco. The climate that it is found in is temperate. It is common to highland and lowland freshwater.

== Habitat ==
Its natural habitats are rivers and intermittent rivers.
