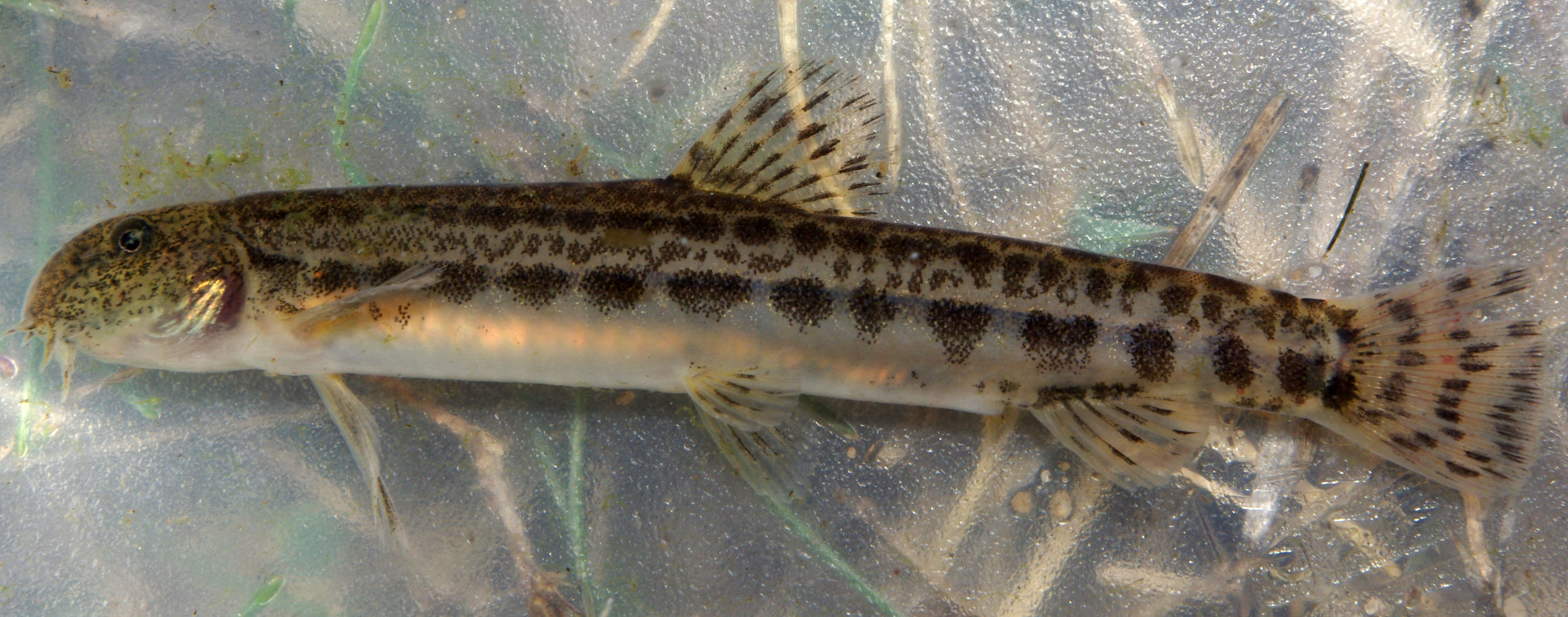

Conservation status
- Least Concern (IUCN 3.1)

Scientific classification
- Kingdom: Animalia
- Phylum: Chordata
- Class: Actinopterygii
- Order: Cypriniformes
- Family: Cobitidae
- Genus: Cobitis
- Species: C. paludica

Binomial name
- Cobitis paludica (F. de Buen, 1930)
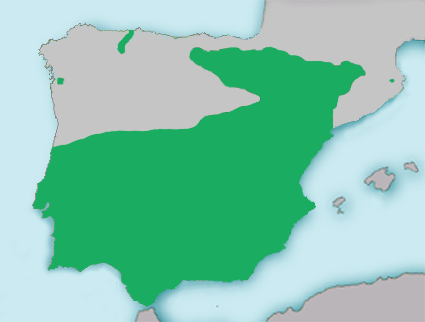

Synonyms
- Cobitis haasi Klausewitz, 1955

= Cobitis paludica =

Species of fish

Cobitis paludica is a species of ray-finned fish in the family Cobitidae. It is found in Portugal and Spain. Its natural habitats are rivers and intermittent rivers. It is threatened by habitat loss.
