= Société zoologique de France =

- Formation: 1876
- Type: Learned society
- Purpose: Promoting zoology, evolution, and biodiversity
- Location: 195 Rue Saint-Jacques, 75005 Paris, France
- Coordinates: 48.844441°N 2.342211°E
- Official language: French
- General Secretary: Alexandra Quilhac
- Founder: Aimé Bouvier
- President: René Lafont
- Vice president: Michel Descamps
- Vice president: Christine Rollard
- Parent organization: Institut océanographique de Paris
- Affiliations: Faculté de Biologie - UFR 927 (Paris-Sorbonne University)
- Website: link

La Société zoologique de France (English: "Zoological Society of France"), founded in 1876 by Aimé Bouvier, is a scientific society devoted to Zoology. It publishes a bulletin and organises the Prix Gadeau de Kerville de la Société zoologique de France.

== List of presidents ==
- 1876–1877: Jules Vian
- 1878: Félix Pierre Jousseaume
- 1879: Edmond Perrier
- 1880: Jules Vian
- 1881: Fernand Lataste
- 1882: Eugène Simon
- 1883: Jules Künckel d'Herculais
- 1884: Maurice Chaper
- 1885: Jean Pierre Mégnin
- 1886: Paul Henri Fischer
- 1887: Adrien Certes
- 1888: Jules Jullien
- 1889: Gustave Cotteau
- 1890: Jules de Guerne
- 1891: Louis-Joseph Alcide Railliet
- 1892: Philippe Dautzenberg
- 1893: Émile Oustalet
- 1894: Lionel Faurot
- 1895: Léon Vaillant
- 1896: Louis Eugène Bouvier
- 1897: Romain Moniez
- 1898: Henri Filhol
- 1899: Charles Janet
- 1900: Yves Delage
- 1901: Édouard Louis Trouessart
- 1902: Arthur René Jean Baptiste Bavay
- 1903: Jules Richard
- 1904: Edgard Hérouard
- 1905: Louis Joubin
- 1906: François-Xavier Raspail
- 1907: Georges Pruvot
- 1908: Paul Marchal
- 1909: Charles Alluaud
- 1910: François-Henri Coutière
- 1911: Jean Baptiste François René Koehler
- 1912: Adrien Dollfus
- 1913: Louis Roule
- 1914: Raphaël Blanchard
- 1915: Maurice Caullery
- 1916: Adrien Lucet
- 1917: Jacques Pellegrin
- 1918: Édouard Chevreux
- 1919: Armand Lucien Clément
- 1920: Émile Topsent
- 1921: Étienne Rabaud
- 1922: Émile Brumpt
- 1923: Paul Carié
- 1924: Charles Pérez
- 1925: Louis Boutan
- 1926: Félix Mesnil
- 1927: Raoul Anthony
- 1928: Édouard Chatton
- 1929: Louis Fage
- 1930: Alphonse Malaquin
- 1931: Lucien Chopard
- 1932: François Picard
- 1933: Armand Billard
- 1934: Léonce Joleaud
- 1935: René Legendre
- 1936: Louis Mercier
- 1937: Marie Phisalix
- 1938: René Jeannel
- 1939: Pierre-Paul Grassé
- 1940: Robert-Philippe Dolfus
- 1941: Emmanuel Fauré-Fremiet
- 1942: Édouard Bourdelle
- 1943: Jacques Millot
- 1944: Marcel Prenant
- 1945: Georges Lavier
- 1946: Henri Piéron
- 1947: Édouard Fischer-Piette
- 1948: Albert Vandel
- 1949: Léon Bertin
- 1950: Paul Marais de Beauchamp
- 1951: Marcel Aberloos
- 1952: Lucien Berland
- 1953: Georges Teissier
- 1954: Raymond Hovasse
- 1955: Paul Vayssière
- 1956: Germaine Cousin
- 1957: Paul Remy
- 1958: Étienne Wolff
- 1959: Maurice Fontaine
- 1960: Marcel Avel
- 1961: Pierre Drach
- 1962: Paul Pesson
- 1963: Odette Tuzet
- 1964: Jean Dorst
- 1965: Georges Busnel
- 1966: François Rollier
- 1967: Alain Chabaud
- 1968: Max Vachon
- 1969: Marc de Larambergue
- 1970: Bertrand Possompès
- 1971: Louis Gallien
- 1972: Hubert Lutz
- 1973: Émile Biliotti
- 1974: Roger Husson
- 1975: Albert Raynaud
- 1976–1977: Charles Bocquet
- 1978–1979: Maxime Lamotte
- 1980–1982: Claude Lévi
- 1983–1984: Jean-Jacques Legrand
- 1985–1986: Pierre Lubet
- 1987–1988: Hubert Saint Girons
- 1989: André Beaumont
- 1990–2008:
- 2009: Jean-Loup d'Hondt
- 2010–2011:
- 2012: René Lafont
- 2018: Philippe Lherminier
