= Cobitis bilseli =

Conservation status
- Endangered (IUCN 3.1)

Scientific classification
- Kingdom: Animalia
- Phylum: Chordata
- Class: Actinopterygii
- Order: Cypriniformes
- Family: Cobitidae
- Genus: Cobitis
- Species: C. bilseli

Binomial name
- Cobitis bilseli Battalgil, 1942

Species of fish

Cobitis bilseli is a species of ray-finned fish in the family Cobitidae found only in Turkey. Its natural habitats are rivers and freshwater lakes. It is threatened by habitat loss.

== Etymology ==
The fish is named in honor of Cemil Bilsel (1879–1949), the Rector of the University of Istanbul, because of his interest in and the support of the study of the fauna of Turkey.
