= Cobitis striata =

Scientific classification
- Kingdom: Animalia
- Phylum: Chordata
- Class: Actinopterygii
- Order: Cypriniformes
- Family: Cobitidae
- Genus: Cobitis
- Species: C. striata

Binomial name
- Cobitis striata Ikeda, 1936

Species of fish

Cobitis striata is a species of fish in the family Cobitidae found in the rivers flowing into the Seto Inland Sea in Honshu, Shikoku, and Kyushu, and rivers flowing into the Japan Sea in Honshu: Kyoto, Osaka, Wakayama, Hyōgo, Okayama, Hiroshima, Yamaguchi, Kagawa, Tokushima, Ehime, and Fukuoka Prefectures in Japan.

== Subspecies ==
There are currently 3 recognized subspecies:

- Cobitis striata fuchigamii Nakajima, 2012
- Cobitis striata hakataensis Nakajima, 2012
- Cobitis striata striata Ikeda, 1936
