= Robia =

Conservation status
- Data Deficient (IUCN 3.1)

Scientific classification
- Kingdom: Animalia
- Phylum: Chordata
- Class: Actinopterygii
- Order: Lophiiformes
- Family: Caulophrynidae
- Genus: Robia; Pietsch, 1979
- Species: R. legula

Binomial name
- Robia legula Pietsch, 1979

Monotypic genus of fish

Robia is a monospecific genus of marine ray-finned fish belonging to the family Caulophrynidae, the fanfins. Its only species is Robia legula which is known from a single specimen collected in the western central Pacific Ocean where it is found at depths of 1,000 to 1,500 metres (3,300 to 4,900 ft).

== Taxonomy ==
Robia was first proposed as a genus in 1979 by the American ichthyologist Theodore Pietsch from a holotype of Robia legula collected from the Banda Sea in the western Pacific at 4°56.5'S, 129°59.5'E from a depth between 1,000 and 1,500 m (3,300 and 4,900 ft). Robia is a monotypic genus and is one of the two genera along with Caulophryne, making up the family Caulophrynidae. which the 5th edition of Fishes of the World classifies within the suborder Ceratioidei of the order Lophiiformes, the anglerfishes.

== Etymology ==
Robia honors Bruce H. Robison of the Monterey Bay Aquarium Research Institute, whose nickname was "Robie", and is a possessive recognising his research bathypelagic fish. The specific name legula means "collector" or "gatherer", Pietsch stated that this was because of the "extraordinary collecting abilities" of this species. Pietsch is assumed to have been referring to the very long illicium, the luring apparatus of anglerfishes, of this species which is more than 2.5 times its standard length, as well as to the holotype being collected in an opening-closing net.

== Description ==
Robia is classified within the fanfin family and this family is characterized by have a high degree of sexual dimorphism. The females have short, round bodies with large mouths. The lower jaw reaches back past the base of the pectoral fin. The teeth in the jaws are thin, backwards curving and depressible. They have highly elongated dorsal and anal fins, with the soft rays of these fins resembling long threads. There are 8 fin rays in the caudal fin. They do not have pelvic fins. The sensory cells of the lateral line system are at the tips of the filamentous rays of the dorsal and anal fins. They have a simple esca, or lure, which lacks a bulb but which may have filaments or appendages. The skin is naked and they do not have any dermal spines. The males are much smaller than the females and have more elongated bodies. They have large eyes and large nostrils, with large olfactory receptors. They have no teeth in the jaws, although there are tooth-like structures on the jaw bones which are used to attach to the larger female. The male do not have elongated dorsal and anal fins but so have large pectoral fins. The juveniles have pelvic fins that are lost when they metamorphose into adults, although the relict pelvic bones are retained. However, Robia is known from a single specimen which was a metamorphosed female. This specimen differed from Caulophryne in its very elongated illicium, 270 mm (11 in) as opposed to 130 mm (5.1 in) The two genera also differ by the count and length of the fin rays in the dorsal and anal fins, in Robia there are 6 rays in the dorsal fin, the longest is 65% of the standard length, and 5 rays in the anal fin with the longest being 40% of the standard length; while in Caulophryne there are between 14 and 22 rays in the dorsal fin with the longest ray having its length equivalent to 70% of the standard length and in the anal fin there are between 12 and 19 fin rays with the longest having its length equivalent to 60% of the standard length. The holoptype of this species had a standard length of 41 mm (1.6 in).

== Distribution and habitat ==
Robia is known only from a single specimen collected in the Banda Sea near Banda Neira in Indonesia which was collected at a depth between 1,000 and 15,000 m (3,300 and 49,200 ft).
