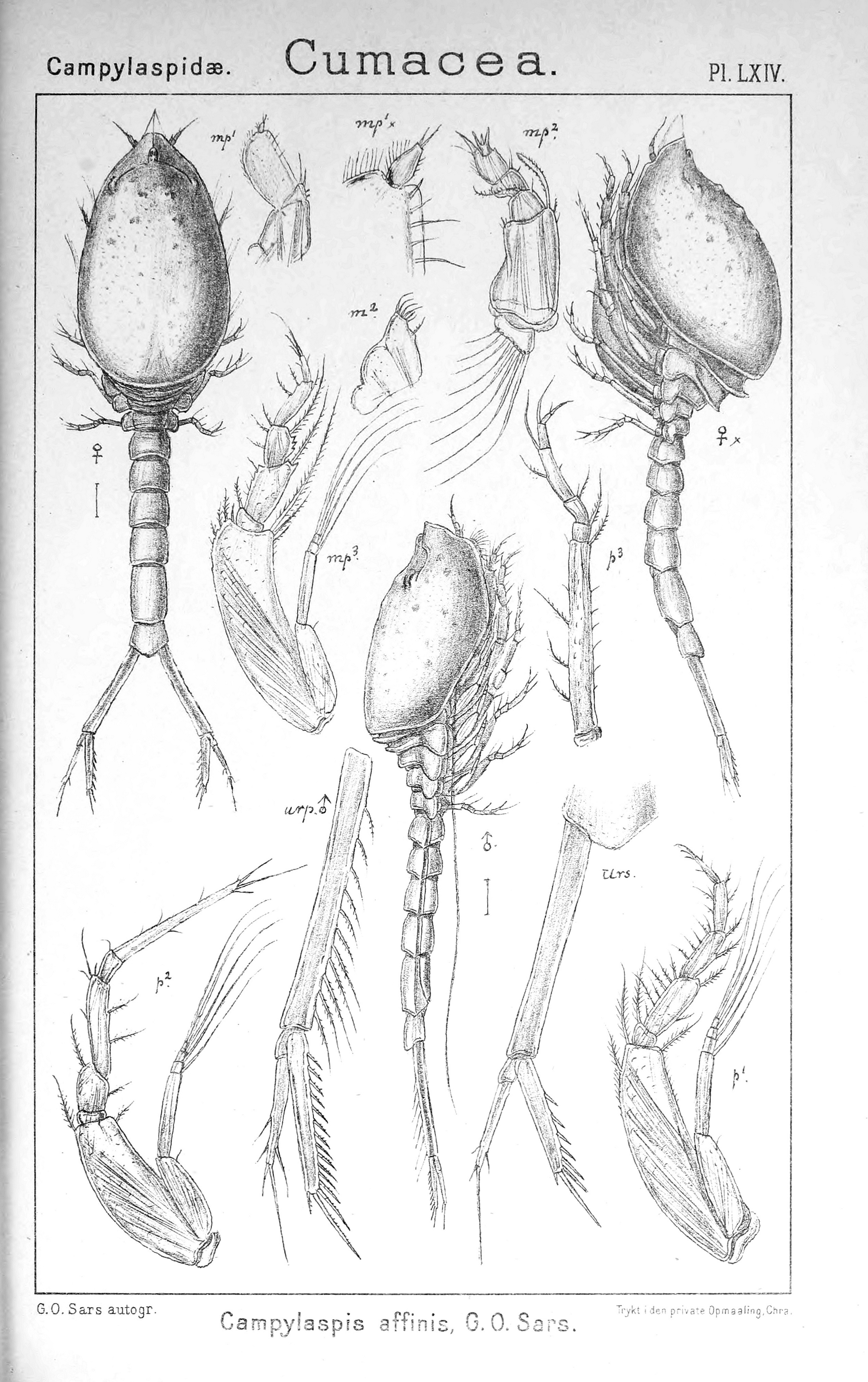
- Campylaspis rubicunda

Scientific classification
- Domain: Eukaryota
- Kingdom: Animalia
- Phylum: Arthropoda
- Class: Malacostraca
- Order: Cumacea
- Family: Nannastacidae; Spence Bate, 1866

= Nannastacidae =

Family of crustaceans

Nannastacidae is a family of crustaceans belonging to the order Cumacea. They have no free telson. The endopods (interior branches) of the uropods are present on one segment. There are exopods (outer branches) on the maxillipeds and generally one on pereopods 1–4 in males and 1–2 in females. In the females the second antenna is much shorter than the first. It contains the following genera:

- Almyracuma Jones & Burbanck, 1959
- Bacescella Petrescu, 2000
- Bathycampylaspis Muhlenhardt-Siegel, 1996
- Campylaspenis Bacescu & Muradian 1974
- Campylaspides Fage, 1929
- Campylaspis G. O. Sars, 1865
- Claudicuma Roccatagliata, 1981
- Cubanocuma Bacescu & Muradian, 1977
- Cumella G. O. Sars, 1865
- Cumellopsis Calman, 1905
- Elassocumella Watling, 1991
- Humesiana Watling & Gerken, 2001
- Nannastacus Bate, 1865
- Normjonesia Petrescu & Heard, 2001
- Paracampylaspis Jones, 1984
- Pavlovskeola Lomakina, 1955
- Platycuma Calman, 1905
- Procampylaspis Bonnier, 1896
- Scherocumella Watling, 1991
- Schizocuma Bacescu, 1972
- Schizotrema Calman, 1911
- Styloptocuma Bacescu & Muradian, 1974
- Styloptocumoides Petrescu, 2006
- Vemacumella Petrescu, 2001
