= Cobitis kellei =

Conservation status
- Extinct (2023) (IUCN 3.1)

Scientific classification
- Kingdom: Animalia
- Phylum: Chordata
- Class: Actinopterygii
- Division: Teleostei
- Order: Cypriniformes
- Family: Cobitidae
- Genus: Cobitis
- Species: †C. kellei

Binomial name
- †Cobitis kellei Erk'akan, Atalay-Ekmekçi & Nalbant, 1998

Species of ray-finned fish

Cobitis kellei, the Diyarbakir spined loach, is an extinct species of loach that was once found in the Göksu stream of southeastern Turkey. Last seen in 1974, the species' population was likely decimated by the construction of a dam in the Göksu waterway that significantly altered its habitat. The species was declared extinct in 2026 following an assessment in 2023.
