= Cobitis levantina =

Conservation status
- Endangered (IUCN 3.1)

Scientific classification
- Kingdom: Animalia
- Phylum: Chordata
- Class: Actinopterygii
- Order: Cypriniformes
- Family: Cobitidae
- Genus: Cobitis
- Species: C. levantina

Binomial name
- Cobitis levantina Krupp & Moubayed, 1992

Species of fish

Cobitis levantina is a species of ray-finned fish in the family Cobitidae. It is found in Lebanon, Syria, and Turkey. Its natural habitats are rivers, intermittent rivers, and irrigated land. It is threatened by habitat loss.
