= Maurice Chaper =

French geologist (1834–1896)

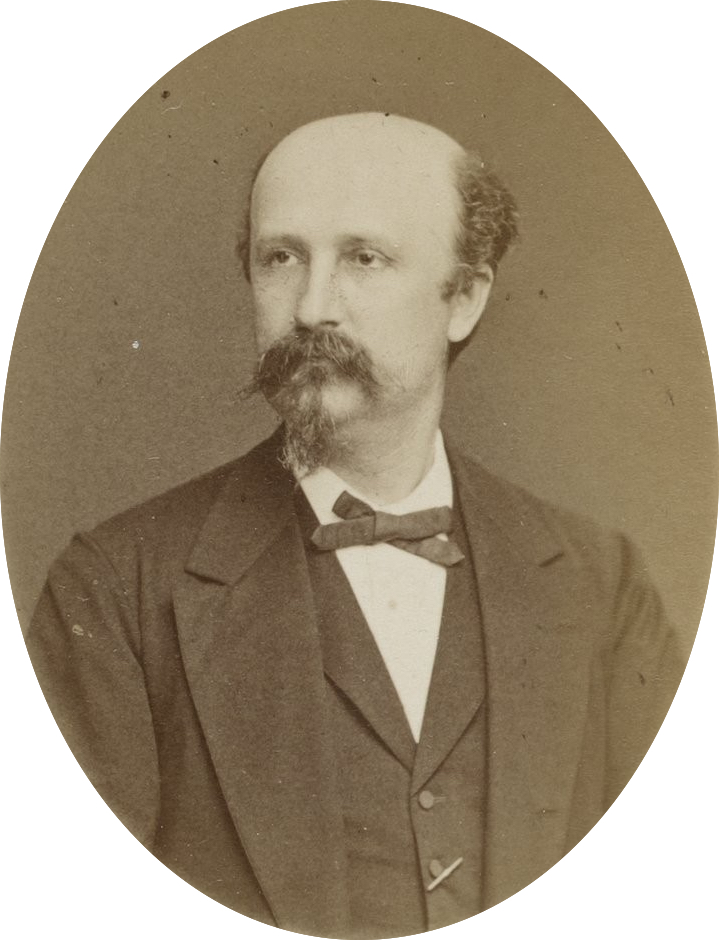

Maurice Armand Chaper (13 February 1834, Dijon – 5 July 1896, Vienna) was a French geologist and mining engineer.

He received his education at the École Polytechnique and École des Mines, afterwards working at jobs for the railroads and public works. He enlisted in the National Guard during the Franco-Prussian War, rising to the rank of lieutenant-colonel in the 38th Regiment. In 1872 he was named assistant mayor of the 5th arrondissement of Paris.

As a member of the Société géologique de France, he began, from 1874, a number of geological and mineralogical missions to all parts of the globe — Venezuela, the Rocky Mountains, Borneo, southern Africa, the Urals, et al. As part of a geological survey in Central America, he was involved with the Compagnie du canal de Panama. In addition to mineralogical collections, he collected zoological and botanical specimens. The species, Millettia chaperii, was named in his honor by botanist François Gagnepain, it being based on Chaper's collection from Borneo. In 1884 he was selected as president of the Société zoologique de France.

== Honors and awards ==
Knight of the Order of Legion of Honour

== Selected publications ==
- Sur les mines de diamant de l'Afrique australe, 1879 - On diamond mines of southern Africa.
- De la Présence du diamant dans une pegmatite de l'Indoustan, 1884 - The presence of diamonds found in pegmatite in Hindustan.
- Constatation de l'existance du terrain glaciaire dans l'Afrique équatoriale, 1886 - Discovering the existence of glaciated terrain in equatorial Africa.
- Extraits d'un rapport de mission sur la côte nord du Vénézuéla, 1887 - Notes from a mission report about the northern coast of Venezuela.
- Notes recueillies au cours d'une exploration dans l'île de Bornéo, 1891 - Collected notes involving an exploratory journey to Borneo.
