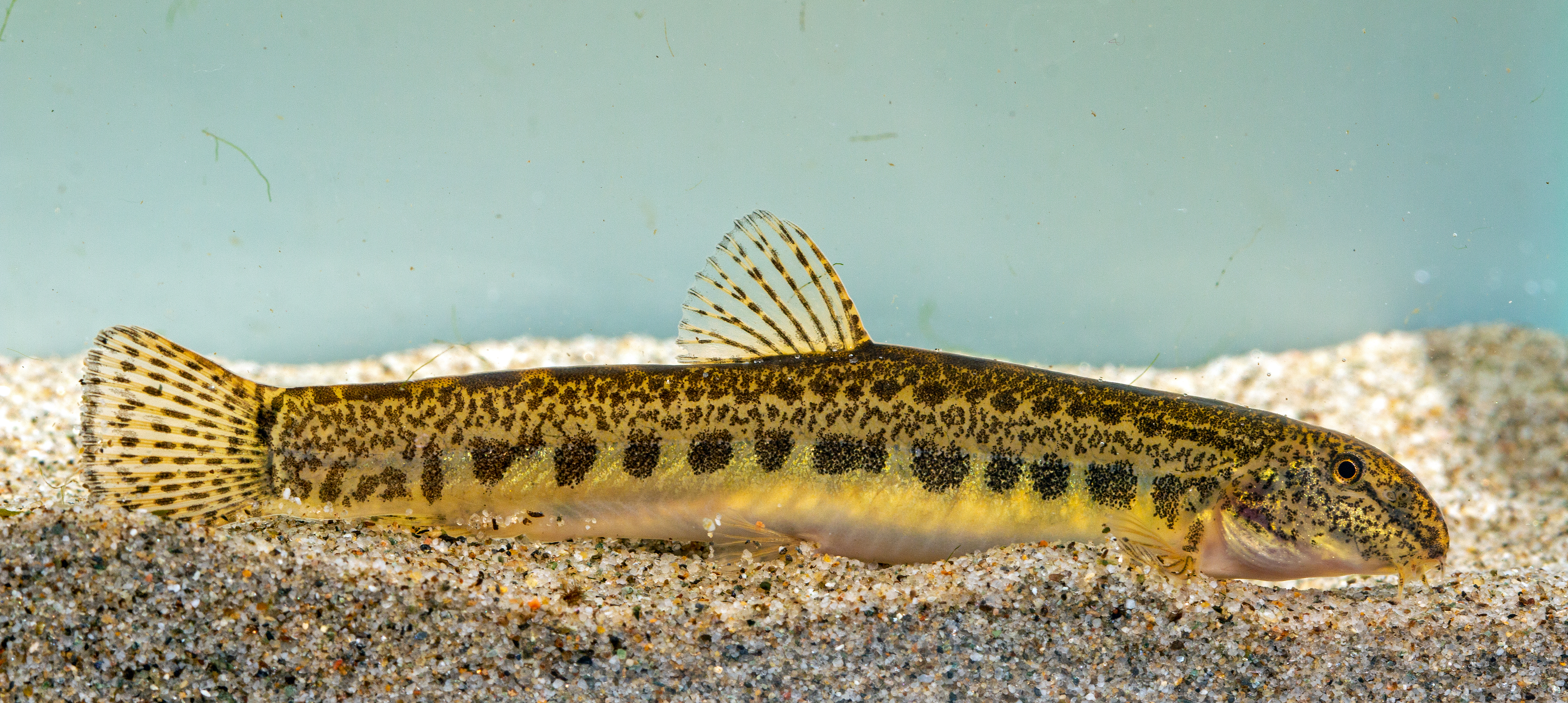

Conservation status
- Vulnerable (IUCN 3.1)

Scientific classification
- Kingdom: Animalia
- Phylum: Chordata
- Class: Actinopterygii
- Order: Cypriniformes
- Family: Cobitidae
- Genus: Cobitis
- Species: C. zanandreai

Binomial name
- Cobitis zanandreai Cavicchioli, 1965

= Cobitis zanandreai =

Species of fish

Cobitis zanandreai is a species of ray-finned fish in the family Cobitidae. It is found only in Central-Italy. It is threatened by habitat loss.
