= Charles Pérez =

French zoologist (1873–1952)

Charles Pérez (19 May 1873 in Bordeaux – 22 September 1952 in Paris) was a French zoologist best known for his research of marine invertebrates and insects. His father, Jean Pérez (1833-1914), was a zoology professor at Bordeaux, and his father's sister was married to Belgian malacologist Paul Pelseneer (1863-1945).

From 1898 to 1902, he was an agrégé préparateur of zoology at the École Normale Supérieure, obtaining his doctorate of sciences in 1902. Afterwards, he worked as a lecturer to the faculty of sciences in Bordeaux, where in 1904, he was appointed professor of zoology and animal physiology. In 1909 he returned to Paris, where he eventually became an associate professor at the Sorbonne.

In 1919 he was named adjoint-director of the zoological station at Wimereux, and in 1921 became director of the laboratory at Roscoff. From 1921 onward, he was a professor of zoology at the Sorbonne. He was a member of several learned sciences, including the Académie des sciences (1935–52) and the Société zoologique de France (president 1924).

== Selected works ==
- Observations sur l'histolyse et l'histogénèse dans la métamorphose des vespides (Polistes gallica L.), 1910 - Observations on histolysis and histogenesis in the metamorphosis of vespids (Polistes gallicus).
- Recherches histologiques sur la métamorphose des Muscides (Calliphora erythrocephala Mg.), 1910 - Histological research on the metamorphosis of Muscidae (Calliphora erythrocephala).
- Les pagures ou Bernards l'ermite (un exemple d'adaptation), 1934 - The hermit crab (an example of adaptation).

Also, he made editions to Réaumur's Mémoires pour servir à l'histoire des insectes.
