= Cobitis meridionalis =

Conservation status
- Endangered (IUCN 3.1)

Scientific classification
- Kingdom: Animalia
- Phylum: Chordata
- Class: Actinopterygii
- Order: Cypriniformes
- Family: Cobitidae
- Genus: Cobitis
- Species: C. meridionalis

Binomial name
- Cobitis meridionalis S. L. Karaman, 1924

Species of fish

Cobitis meridionalis is a species of ray-finned fish in the family Cobitidae. It is found in Albania, Greece, and North Macedonia.

Its natural habitat is freshwater lakes. It is threatened by habitat loss.
