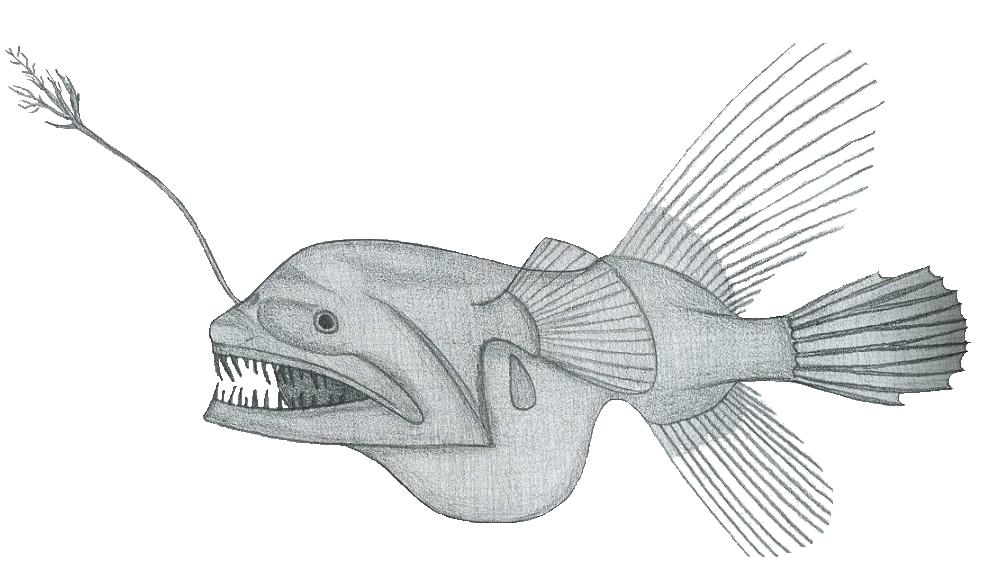

Conservation status
- Data Deficient (IUCN 3.1)

Scientific classification
- Kingdom: Animalia
- Phylum: Chordata
- Class: Actinopterygii
- Order: Lophiiformes
- Family: Caulophrynidae
- Genus: Caulophryne
- Species: C. pelagica

Binomial name
- Caulophryne pelagica (Brauer, 1902)

Synonyms
- Melanocetus pelagicus Brauer, 1902; Caulophryne acinosa Regan & Trewavas, 1932; Caulophryne ramulosa Regan & Trewavas, 1932; Caulophryne pietschi Balushkin & Fedorov, 1985

= Caulophryne pelagica =

Species of fish

Caulophryne pelagica is a species of marine ray-finned fish belonging to the family Caulophrynidae, the fanfins. This species is a deepwater species which is found in the eastern Atlantic, Indian Ocean, Pacific Ocean and Southern Ocean. Its biology is little known but similar species show extreme sexual dimorphism with the very small males seeking out and attaching themselves to the much larger females and becoming parasites of the females.

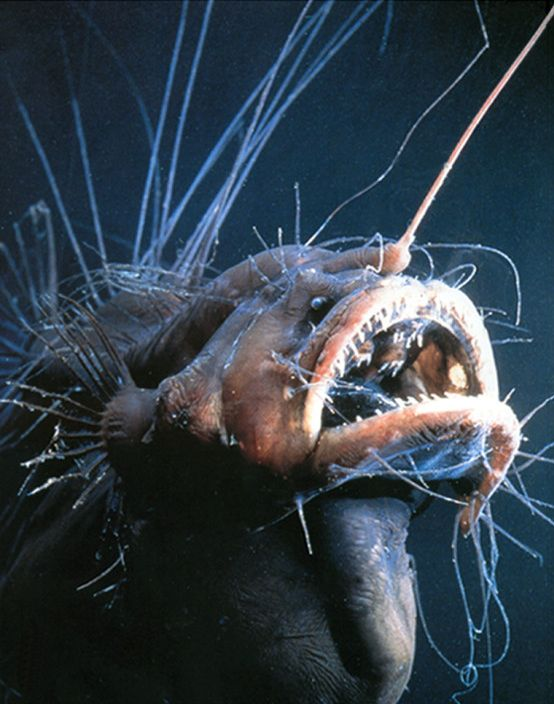
Photograph of Caulophryne pelagica

== Taxonomy ==
Caulophryne pelagica was first formally described in 1902 as Melanocetus pelagicus by the German zoologist August Brauer with its type locality given as west of the Chagos Archipelago in the Indian Ocean from Valdivia station 228 from a depth of 0–2,500 m (0–8,202 ft) in water with a bottom depth of 3,460 m (11,350 ft). This species is classified within the genus Caulophryne which is one of two genera within the family Caulophrynidae. The 5th edition of Fishes of the World classifies the Caulophrynidae within the suborder Ceratioidei of the order Lophiiformes, the anglerfishes.

== Etymology ==
Caulophryne pelagica is a species within the genus Caulophryne, a combination of caulis, "stem", an allusion to the stem-like base of the illicium, and phryne "toad", a suffix commonly used in the names of anglerfish genera. Its use may date as far back as Aristotle and Cicero, who referred to anglerfishes as "fishing-frogs" and "sea-frogs", respectively, possibly because of a physical resemblance. The specific name pelagica derives from pelagios, meaning "of the open sea", a reference to the bathypelagic environment the holotype was collected from.

== Description ==
Caulophryne pelagica has a high degree of sexual dimorphism. The females have short, round bodies with large mouths. The lower jaw reaches back past the base of the pectoral fin. The teeth in the jaws are thin, backwards curving and depressible. They have highly elongated dorsal and anal fins, with the soft rays of these fins resembling long threads. There are 8 fin rays in the caudal fin. They do not have pelvic fins. The sensory cells of the lateral line system are at the tips of the filamentous rays of the dorsal and anal fins. They have a simple esca, or lure, which lacks a bulb but which may have filaments or appendages. The skin is naked and they do not have any dermal spines. The males are much smaller than the females and have more elongated bodies. They have large eyes and large nostrils, with large olfactory receptors. They have no teeth in the jaws, although there are tooth-like structures on the jaw bones which are used to attach to the larger female. The male do not have elongated dorsal and anal fins but so have large pectoral fins. C. pelagica has a dark coloured illicium, that has no translucent filaments along its length other than near to the esca and which has a length equivalent to between 18% and 125.8% of the standard length, the longer the fish is, the greater the relative length of the illicium. The esca has between 5 and 7 elongated, filamentous appendages, 2 to 4 unbranched appendages close to its base and 3 or 4 branched appendages near its tip. The dorsal fin has between 14 and 17 soft rays while the anal fin has 12 soft rays. The maximum published total length is 15 cm (5.9 in) for females.

== Distribution and habitat ==
Caulophryne pelagica is found in the eastern Atlantic Ocean, the Indo-Pacific region and the Southern Ocean. In the Eastern Atlantic it is known only from the waters off Cape Verde, Gambia, Senegal, Mauritania and Western Sahara. In the Indo-Pacific it has a wide distribution from Somalia and the Madives east to Hawaii and in the eastern Pacific where it has been collected off Alaska, Baja California, the Gulf of Panama and Ecuador to as far south as 4°S, while in the Southern Ocean it is known from New Zealand and Australia. This species is found in mesopelagic and bathypelagic zones at depths between 954 and 2,500 m (3,130 and 8,202 ft).

== Biology ==
Caulophryne pelagicas biology is almost unknown. The anglerfishes in this genus are predators using the illicium and ecsa to lure in prey. The males are much smaller than the females and have highly developed sensory apparatus which are used to find the females which the males attach themselves to and become sexual parasites of. There are, however, no known male specimens for this species.
