= Cobitis fahireae =

Conservation status
- Least Concern (IUCN 3.1)

Scientific classification
- Kingdom: Animalia
- Phylum: Chordata
- Class: Actinopterygii
- Order: Cypriniformes
- Family: Cobitidae
- Genus: Cobitis
- Species: C. fahireae

Binomial name
- Cobitis fahireae Erk'akan, Atalay-Ekmekçi & Nalbant, 1998

Synonyms
- "Cobitis fahirae" (lapsus)

Species of fish

Cobitis fahireae. the Küçük Menderes spined loach, is a species of loach endemic to Turkey, where it occurs in intermittent rivers.

== Etymology ==
The fish is named in memory of according to the authors "one of the greatest ichthyologists of Turkey", Fahire Battalgil.

== Size ==
This species reaches a length of 10.4 cm (4.1 in)
