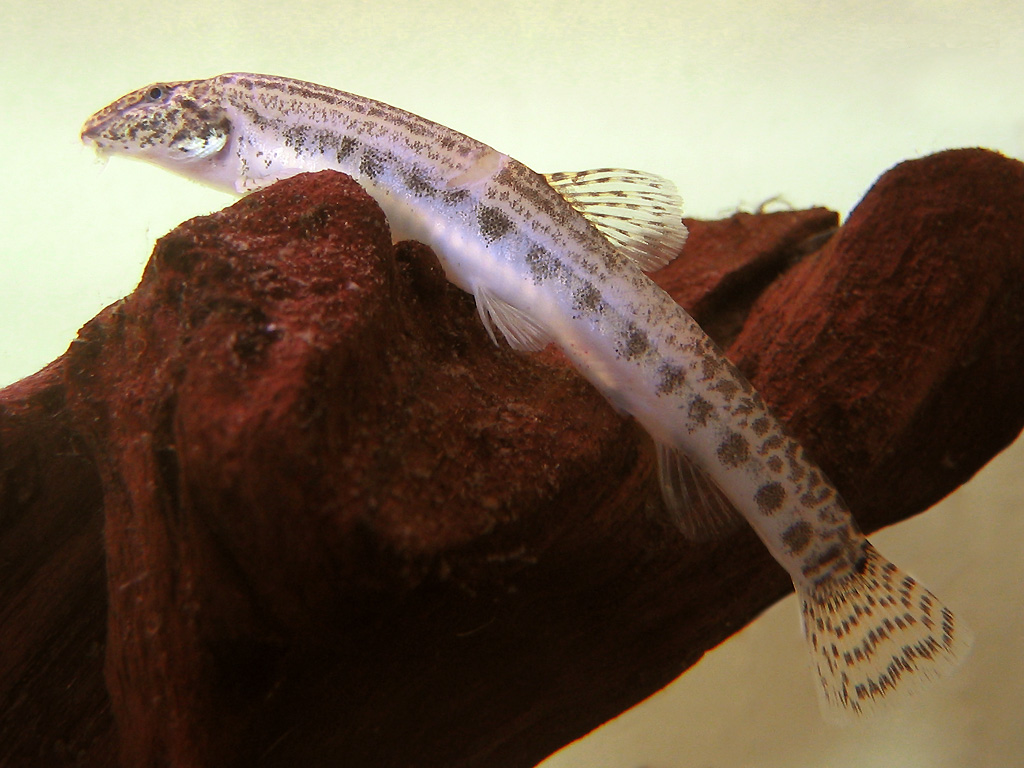

Conservation status
- Least Concern (IUCN 3.1)

Scientific classification
- Kingdom: Animalia
- Phylum: Chordata
- Class: Actinopterygii
- Order: Cypriniformes
- Family: Cobitidae
- Genus: Cobitis
- Species: C. taenia

Binomial name
- Cobitis taenia Linnaeus, 1758

Synonyms
- Cobitis spilura Holandre, 1837; Cobitinula anatoliae Hankó, 1925; Cobitis taenioides M.C. Băcescu and R. Mayer, 1969

= Spined loach =

Species of fish

The spined loach (Cobitis taenia) is a common freshwater fish in Europe. It is sometimes known as the spotted weather loach, not to be confused with the "typical" weather loaches of the genus Misgurnus. This is the type species of the spiny loach genus (Cobitis) and the true loach family (Cobitidae).

== Description ==
The spined loach typically reaches an adult length of 8–10 cm (3.1–3.9 in), although females may grow up to 12 cm (4.7 in). Adults weigh between 20–60 g (0.7–2.1 oz). Their backs feature a yellow-brown colouring interspersed with many small grey or brown scales on the spinal ridge. The scales on the belly are pale yellow or orange. The body overall is long and thin. There are six barbels around the mouth. Under the eyes there is a two-pointed spike, with which the fish can inflict a painful sting.

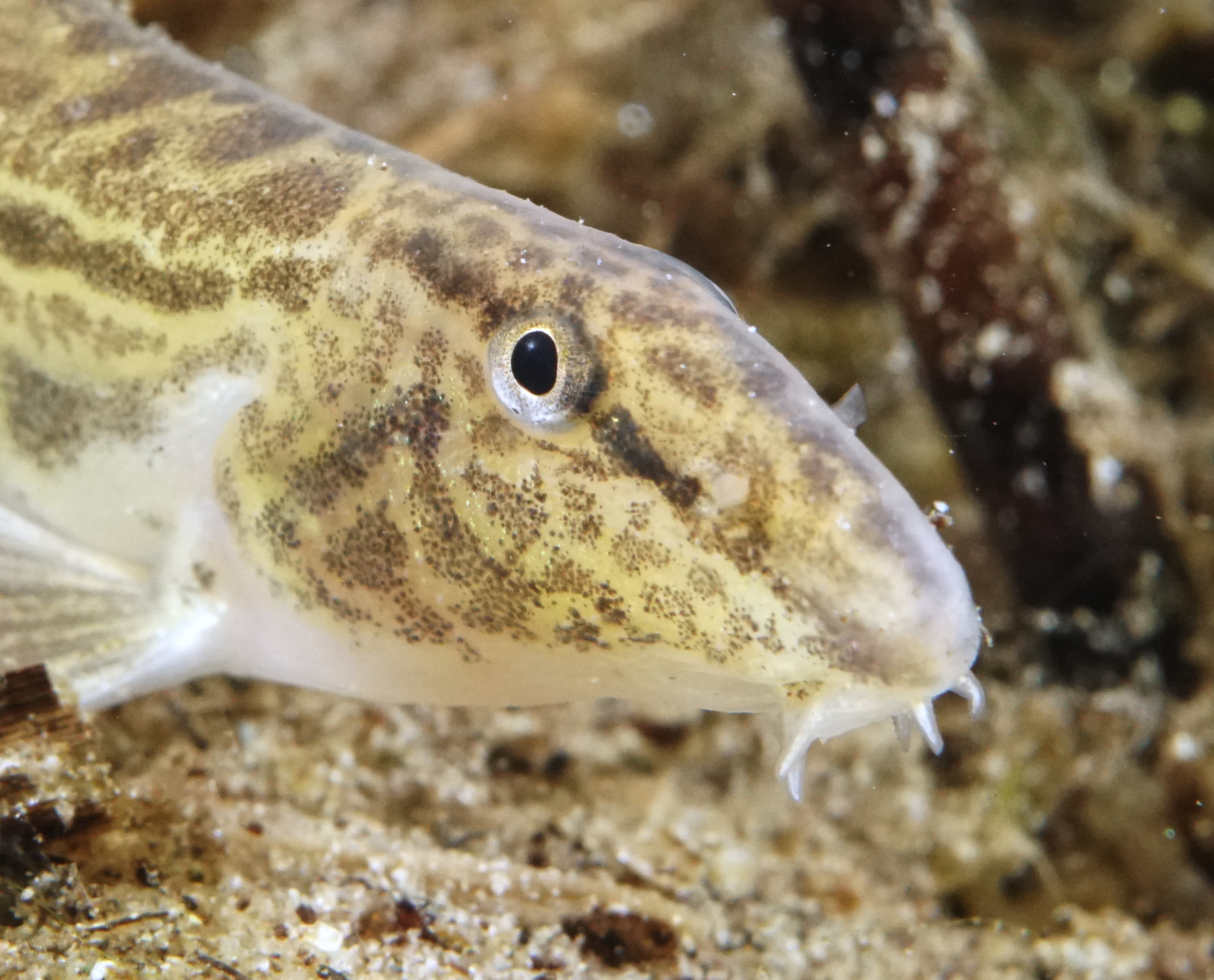
The spined loach has six barbels.

== Distribution and relationships ==
It is found from the Volga River basin to France. Generally it occurs across much of temperate Europe north of the Alpide belt, with the exceptions of Ireland, Scotland, Wales and northern Scandinavia. Some populations are also found just south of the Alpides. In the UK, the spined loach appears to be restricted to five east-flowing river systems in eastern England – the Rivers Trent, Welland, Witham, Nene and Great Ouse.

Populations of southwestern Europe were formerly included in this species, but actually represent distinct branches of Cobitis. A member of subgenus Cobitis, close relatives of the spined loach are C. elongatoides, C. fahirae, C. tanaitica or C. vardarensis, which replace it in northern Greece, much of Romania, and western Turkey.

== Ecology and behaviour ==
Clear oxygen-rich water is preferred by the spined loach, be it slowly flowing brooks, rivers or still water. They are found near flat and sandy or stony areas, frequently in large numbers. The spined loach is often kept as an ornamental fish in aquaria.

During the day, they bury themselves in the bed of the body of water, leaving only the head and tail exposed. At night, when the loach is most active, sand on the riverbed is consumed, and with it small animals and other organic material. Sand, stripped of nutrients, is ejected through the gills. This process must continue all night for the fish to get enough calories to survive.

Spined loaches can breathe intestinally. This stop-gap measure sustains the spined loach when the water around it is oxygen-poor. At the water's surface, swallowed air brings oxygen into the intestine. The expended air is expelled through the anus.

The spawning season is from April to June. The females produce between 300 and 1,500 eggs close to the ground, on stones, roots or plants. The eggs are then fertilized by the males. The larvae hatch in 4 to 6 days.

The spined loach's lifespan is between 3 and 5 years, with the maximum reached in captivity being 10 years.

== See also ==
- Loach
