= Mihai Băcescu =

Romanian zoologist

- Born: 28 March 1908; Broşteni, Romania
- Died: 6 August 1999 (aged 91); Bucharest, Romania
- Occupation: Marine zoologist

Mihai Băcescu (28 March 1908 – 6 August 1999) was a Romanian zoologist.

== Biography ==
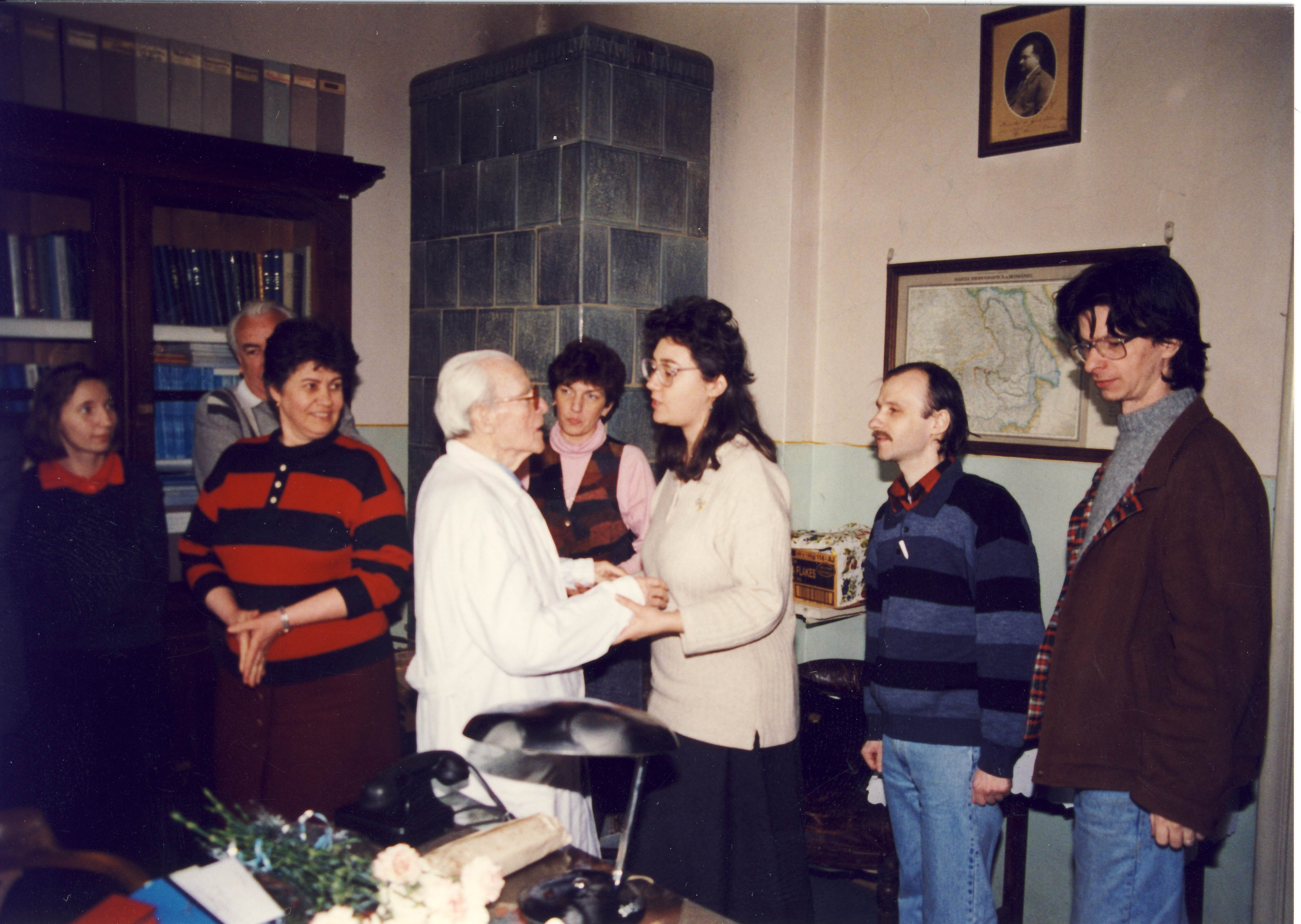
Antipa Museum team congratulates Michael Băcescu on the occasion of his 88th birthday, 28 March 1996

Mihai Băcescu was born in Broșteni, Suceava, northern Romania on 28 March 1906. He was orphaned at the age of four. He entered university in 1933, and five years later published a thesis on Romanian Mysidacea. He won a scholarship to France in 1939 and worked at the National Museum of Natural History in Paris, the Oceanographic Museum of Monaco, at the Marine Biological Stations at Banyuls-sur-Mer and at Roscoff. He met the French zoologists Louis Fage (1883–1964), Édouard Chatton (1883–1947), Charles Pérez (1873–1952) and Jules Richard (1863–1945).

On the intervention of Grigore Antipa (1867–1944), in 1940 Băcescu was transferred from the University of Iaşi to the National Museum of Natural History in Bucharest. He worked there until the end of his life, and headed the museum for nearly thirty years. He held various other positions in the fields of marine research and fisheries in Romania. Băcescu participated in several scientific expeditions to the coasts of Peru and Chile (1965), Mauritania (1975), Arabia (1977) and Tanzania (1973–1974). Bacescu founded the Museum of Falticeni. He was a member of the Romanian Academy, and of the French Society of Zoology and Director of the Institute of Oceanography Albert 1er in Monaco.

He died in Bucharest on 6 August 1999.

== Work ==
Băcescu issued nearly 480 publications on all types of animals. He was interested in their morphology, taxonomy and zoogeography, and also in the protection of species and in their relationship with humans. His main specializations were the Mysidacea, Cumacea and Tanaidacea, of which he described more than three hundred new taxa including several families. He was also the author of numerous books on the ecology of the Black Sea, the fauna of Romania, bioethnology, etc.. As a tribute to his work, more than 70 taxa have been dedicated to him by various scientists. Louis Fage named a species of Cumacea, Diastyloides bacescoi. In turn, he named a Cumacea Cumopsis fagei.

== Partial list of publications ==
- Bacescu, M. (1950). "Cumaceii Mediteraneeni modificati of mediul pontic." Analele Academiei Republicii Populare Romine Tomül 3 (Memoriul 2): 453–457.
- Bacescu, M. (1951). "Cumacea." Analele Academiei Republicii Populare Romine Tomül 4 (1): 5–91.
- Bacescu, M. (1951). " Nannastacus euxinicus n. sp. Cumaceu new gasit în Apele Mari Negro. " Comunicarile Academiei Republicii Populare Romine Tomül 1 (7): 585–592.
- Bacescu, M. (1956). " Cumopsis fagei n. sp. Cumacé again from the waters of the French coast of the English Channel. " Life and Environment 7 (3): 357–365.
- Bacescu, M. (1961). "Two new species of Makrokylindrus subgenus Vemakylindrus n. sp. (Crustacea, cumaceans) of the tropical Pacific (Americani Coast). " Analele Academiei Republicii Populare Romine Tomül 6 (3): 326–333.
- Bacescu, M. (1961). "Contribution to the study of cumaceans Mediterranean and particularly the coast of Israel." Reports and Minutes of meetings ICSEM 16 : 496–502.
- Bacescu, M. (1962). "Contribution to the knowledge of Gender Makrokylindrus Stebbing (Crustacea, Cumacea). " Abyssal Crustacea 1 : 210–222.
- Bacescu, M. (1969). "Two new cumaceans: Diastyloides carpinei n. sp. Hemilamprops in the Mediterranean and Atlantic lotusae in Argentina. " Romanian Journal of Biology, Academia Republicii Socialiste România 164–171.
- Bacescu, M. (1971). "Cumacea from the littoral waters of Florida (Caribbean Sea)." Work of the Natural History Museum Grigore Antipa 11 : 7–23.
- Bacescu, M. (1972). " Archaeocuma and Schizocuma, new genera of Cumacea from the American tropical waters. " Romanian Journal of Biology, Academia Republicii Socialiste România 17 : 241–250.
- Bacescu, M. (1972). " Cumella africana n. sp. and Makrokylindrus (Coalescuma) reyssi n. sp. (Cumacea, Crustacea) from the Saharan bottom of the Atlantic. " Romanian Journal of Biology, Academia Republicii Socialiste România (143–151).
- Bacescu, M. (1973). "Bibliographia Cumanceorum." Cecetari Marine IRCM 5, 6 : 226–261.
- Bacescu, M. (1979). " Heteroleucon heardi n. sp. from the Mexican Gulf. " Romanian Journal of Biology, Academia Republicii Socialiste România 24 : 95–97.
- Bacescu, M. (1982). "Contributions to the knowledge of cumaceans Sea of Marmara and Aegean (Eubea Island)." Work of the Natural History Museum Grigore Antipa 24 : 45–54.
- Bacescu, M. (1982). "Contribution to the study of cumaceans Mediterranean and particularly the coast of Israel." Reports and Minutes of meetings ICSEM 16 (2): 495–501.
- Bacescu, M. (1988). I Cumacea (Fam. Archaeocumatidae, Lampropidae, Bodotriidae, Leuconidae). The Hague, Academic Publishing.
- Bacescu, M. (1990). "New Cumacea from Northern Australian waters." Beaufortia 41 (2): 9–13.
- Bacescu, M. (1991). " Campylaspis wardi n. sp. and Gynodiastylis nordaustraliana n. sp. waters from the coast of Northern Australia. " Work of the Natural History Museum Grigore Antipa 31 : 317–322.
- Bacescu, M. (1991). "Underwater in Bermuda." Romanian Journal of Biology, Academia Republicii Socialiste România 36 : 1–5.
- Bacescu, M. (1992). "On some Cyclaspis (Crustacea, Cumacea) nw waters of Australia. " Work of the Natural History Museum Grigore Antipa 32 : 251–256.
- Bacescu, M. (1992). "Two new species of Cumella (Crustacea, Cumacea) of underwater caves of Bermuda." Work of the Natural History Museum Grigore Antipa 32 : 257–262.
- Bacescu, M. (1992). Cumacea II: Families Nannastacidae, Diastylidae, Pseudocumatidae, Gynodiastylidae and Ceratocumatidae . The Hague, Academic Publishing.
- Bacescu, M. (1994). "The list of taxa Described by Mihai Bacescu." Work of the Natural History Museum Gigore Antipa 34 : 611–615.
- Bacescu, M. and De Quieroz EL (1985). "The contribution of Cumacea in the feeding of the Rajidae Sympterigia acuta and S. bonaparti from Rio Grande do Sul S. Brazil. " Work of the Natural History Museum Grigore Antipa 27 : 9–18.
- Bacescu, M. and Hothuis LB (1988). " Bodotria Goodsir, 1843 (Crustacea, Cumacea): proposed conservation. " Bulletin of Zoological Nomenclature 45 (4): 264–266.
- Bacescu, M. and Hothuis LB (1988). " Iphinoe Bate, 1856 (Crustacea, Cumacea): proposed conservation. " Bulletin of Zoological Nomenclature 45 ( 4): 267–269.
- Bacescu, M. and Hothuis LB (1988). " Leucon Krøyer, 1846 (Crustacea, Cumacea): proposed conservation. " Bulletin of Zoological Nomenclature 45 (4): 270–271.
- Bacescu, M. and Z. Muradian (1972). "Three new species of Procampylaspis (Cumacea) from Mauritanian waters (Atlantic Tropical Eastern). " Romanian Journal of Biology, Academia Republicii Socialiste Romania 17 (3–13).
- Bacescu, M. and Z. Muradian (1972). "New species of Nannastacidae (Crustacea, cumaceans) in Saharan waters of the Atlantic." Rev. Trav. Inst. Marit Fisheries 36 (3): 255–269.
- Bacescu, M. and Z. Muradian (1974). " Floridocuma selvakumarani gen. November, sp. November and is Bathycumella Africana gen. November, sp. November – new Nannastacidae (Cumacea) from over 200 m depth. " Work of the Natural History Museum Grigore Antipa: 103–110.
- Bacescu, M. and Z. Muradian (1974). " Campylaspenis, Styloptocuma, Atlantocuma, new genera of Cumacea from the deep waters of the Atlantic. " Romanian Journal of Biology, Academia Republicii Socialiste România 19 (2): 71–79.
- Bacescu, M. and Z. Muradian (1974). "New Cumacea from the North-Western Atlantic: Ceratocuma panamensis n. sp. Cimmerius costlowi n. sp. upon and some comments Petalosarsia declivis (GO Sars). " Romanian Journal of Biology, Academia Republicii Socialiste România 19 : 217–227.
- Bacescu, M. and Z. Muradian (1975). "New Cumacea from the Red Sea." Work of the Natural History Museum Grigore Antipa: 35–69.
- Bacescu, M. and Z. Muradian (1976). " Bathylamprops motasi sp. n. from the West Atlantic and some considerations on the genus. " Studii if Comunicari, Muzeul of ale Stiinte Naturii din Bacau: 15–19.
- Bacescu, M. and Z. Muradian (1977). "Species of the Genus Cumella (Cumacea, Nannastacidae) from the tropical Western Atlantic. " Work of the Natural History Museum Gigore Antipa 18 : 89–101.
- Bacescu, M. and Z. Muradian (1977). " Cubanocuma gutzui gen., and. sp. n. (Cumacea, Nannastacidae) from the tropical Western Atlantic. " Romanian Journal of Biology, Academia Republicii Socialiste România 22 (1): 3–9.
- Bacescu, M. and Z. Muradian (1978). " Fontainella mediterranea gen. n., sp. n., Cumacé (Pseudocumatidae) found in the eastern Mediterranean. " Romanian Journal of Biology, Academia Republicii Socialiste România 23 : 3–7.
- Bacescu, M. and I. Petrescu (1991). "New Cumacea (Crustacea, Peracarida ) from the coastal waters of Brazil. " Work of the Natural History Museum Grigore Antipa 31 : 327–340.
- Bacescu, M. and I. Petrescu (1999). Treaty of Zoology, Anatomy, Taxonomy, Biology. Memoirs of the Monaco Oceanographic Institute. P.-P. Grasse. Paris, Masson. 7, Issue IIIA.
- Bacescu-Mester, L. (1967). "Contribution to the knowledge of the Genus Leptostylis Sars (Cumacea): three new species collected by the Vema expedition. " Crustaceana 13 (18): 266–274.

== Taxon described by him ==
- See Category:Taxa named by Mihai Băcescu

== Taxon named in his honor ==
- Caulophryne bacescui of marine ray-finned fishes belonging to the family Caulophrynidae, the fanfins or hairy anglerfishes. It is known from a single specimen collected from the Eastern Pacific Ocean.
- Apletodon dentatus bacescui (Antoniu-Murgoci 1940)
- Menziesichthys bacescui Nalbant & R. F. Mayer, 1971 is a species of marine ray-finned fish belonging to the family Liparidae, the snailfishes. This species is found in the Peru–Chile Trench in the eastern Pacific Ocean.
