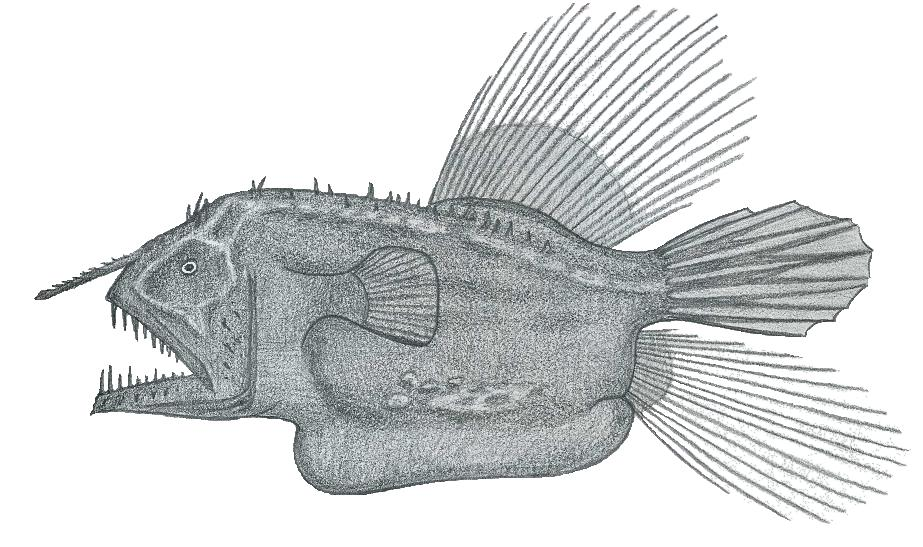

Conservation status
- Least Concern (IUCN 3.1)

Scientific classification
- Kingdom: Animalia
- Phylum: Chordata
- Class: Actinopterygii
- Order: Lophiiformes
- Family: Caulophrynidae
- Genus: Caulophryne
- Species: C. polynema

Binomial name
- Caulophryne polynema Regan, 1930

= Caulophryne polynema =

Species of fish

Caulophryne polynema, the hairy seadevil or hairy anglerfish, is a species of marine ray-finned fish belonging to the family Caulophrynidae, the fanfins. This species is a deepwater species which is found in the Atlantic and Pacific Oceans. Like other deepwater anglerfishes it shows extreme sexual dimorphism with the males being much smaller than the females and acting as sexual parasites of the females.

== Taxonomy ==
Caulophryne polynema was first formally described in 1930 by the English ichthyologist Charles Tate Regan with its type locality given as off Funchal Bay on Madeira in the eastern Atlantic Ocean. This species is classified in the genus Caulophryne which is one of two genera within the family Caulophrynidae. The 5th edition of Fishes of the World classifies the Caulophrynidae within the suborder Ceratioidei of the order Lophiiformes, the anglerfishes.

== Etymology ==
Caulophryne polynema is a species within the genus Caulophryne, this name is a combination of caulis "stem", an allusion to the stem-like base of the illicium, and phryne "toad", a suffix commonly used in the names of anglerfish genera. Its use may date as far back as Aristotle and Cicero, who referred to anglerfishes as "fishing-frogs" and "sea-frogs", respectively, possibly because of a physical resemblance. The specific name, polynema, means "many threads" an allusion to the large number of filaments along the illicium, head, and body.

== Description ==
Caulophryne polynema has a high degree of sexual dimorphism. The females have short, round bodies with large mouths. The lower jaw reaches back past the base of the pectoral fin. The teeth in the jaws are thin, backwards curving and depressible. They have highly elongated dorsal and anal fins, with the soft rays of these fins resembling long threads. There are 8 fin rays in the caudal fin. They do not have pelvic fins. The sensory cells of the lateral line system are at the tips of the filamentous rays of the dorsal and anal fins. They have a simple esca, or lure, which lacks a bulb but which may have filaments or appendages. The skin is naked and they do not have any dermal spines. The males are much smaller than the females and have more elongated bodies. They have large eyes and large nostrils, with large olfactory receptors. They have no teeth in the jaws, although there are tooth-like structures on the jaw bones which are used to attach to the larger female. The male do not have elongated dorsal and anal fins but so have large pectoral fins. The illicium of this species is lightly coloured along its front edge and bears a large number of translucent, long filaments, the longest being up to 71% of the length of the illicium and most of these have their origins on the rear edge of the illicium. The esca is made up of an appendage on the rear to the side with a flattened, opaque, distal tip and another tapering appendage on its tip which has an opaque distal tip, there is a large number of filaments on the esca in individuals with a length greater than 44 mm (1.7 in), the number and length of filaments is less in smaller individuals. The dorsal fin has between 19 and 22 rays while the anal fin 17 to 19 rays. The maximum published total length of this species is 21 cm (8.3 in).

== Distribution and habitat ==
Caulophryne polynema is found in the Atlantic Ocean from Florida in the west to Madeira in the east and as far south as Cape Verdeand as far north as Iceland. It is also been found off the Democratic Republic of Congo south to 28°S off Namibia. In the Eastern Pacific Ocean it has been recorded in Hawaii, Southern California and Baja California. This species is found in the mesopelagic and bathypelagic zones at depths between 585 and 2,100 m (1,919 and 6,890 ft).

== Biology ==
Caulophryne polynema is a predatory species in which the females lure prey into range with the esca and illicium. The males have spohisticated senory organs which they use to detect females. Once they have found a female they attach to it as a sexual parasite and eventually they merge with the female's circulatory and nervous systems.
