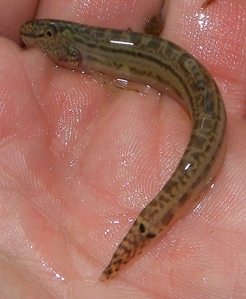

Conservation status
- Least Concern (IUCN 3.1)

Scientific classification
- Kingdom: Animalia
- Phylum: Chordata
- Class: Actinopterygii
- Order: Cypriniformes
- Family: Cobitidae
- Genus: Cobitis
- Species: C. bilineata

Binomial name
- Cobitis bilineata Canestrini, 1865
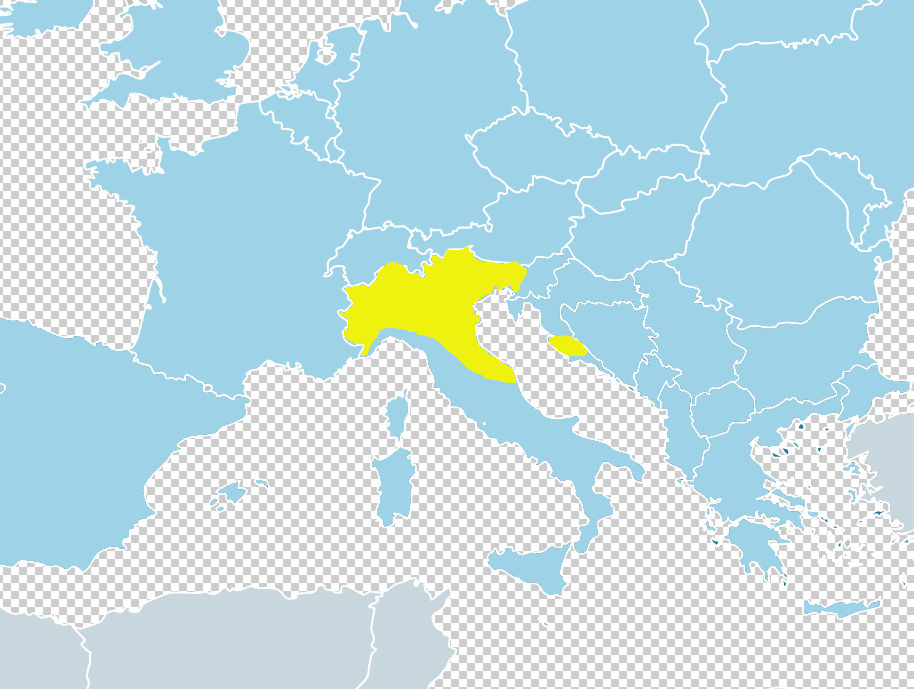
- Native range only

Synonyms
- Cobitis taenia var. puta Cantoni, 1882; Cobitis taenia var. bilineata Canestrini, 1865; Cobitis taenia var. septa Cantoni, 1882

= Cobitis bilineata =

Species of fish

Cobitis bilineata, the Italian spined loach, is a species of ray-finned fish in the family Cobitidae found in northern Italy, Slovenia, and Switzerland. Its natural habitats are intermittent rivers and freshwater marshes. It has been accidentally introduced to Croatia, France, Spain and the rest of Italy, including Sardinia. It is considered Least concern by the IUCN and the EEC.
