= Jules Richard (oceanographer) =

French oceanographer and carcinologist

Jules Richard (18 November 1863 – 24 January 1945) was a French oceanographer and carcinologist, with a focus on copepods. He was for many years the assistant to Albert I, Prince of Monaco, served as director of the Oceanographic Museum in Monaco, and was a president of the Zoological Society of France.

== Bibliography ==
- Page, L. (1945). "Le Docteur Jules Richard (1863-1945)". Bulletin de la Société Zoologique de France. 70: 37–39.
- Portier, P. (1945). "Le Docteur Jules Richard, Directeur du Musee Oceanographique de Monaco, Correspondant de l'Institut de France (1863-1945)". Bulletin de l'Institut Oceanographique, Monaco. 881: 1–19.
- Page, L. (1946). "Hommages au Docteur Jules Richard, Directeur du Musee Oceanographique de Monaco". Bulletin de l'Institut Oceanographique, Monaco. 892: 1–24.
- Rouch, J. (1948). "Le Docteur Jules Richard, Directeur du Musee Oceanographique de Monaco (1863-1945)". Riviera Scientifique (Bulletin de l'Association des Naturalistes de Nice et des Alpes-Maritimes). 35: 1–10.
