= Cobitis trichonica =

Conservation status
- Near Threatened (IUCN 3.1)

Scientific classification
- Kingdom: Animalia
- Phylum: Chordata
- Class: Actinopterygii
- Order: Cypriniformes
- Family: Cobitidae
- Genus: Cobitis
- Species: C. trichonica

Binomial name
- Cobitis trichonica Stephanidis, 1974

Species of fish

Cobitis trichonica is a species of ray-finned fish in the family Cobitidae. It is found only in Greece.

It is threatened by water abstraction. This species is short-lived and lives in lakes and lowland water courses with little current.

== Sources ==
- Froese, Rainer; Pauly, Daniel (eds.). "Cobitis trichonica". FishBase.
