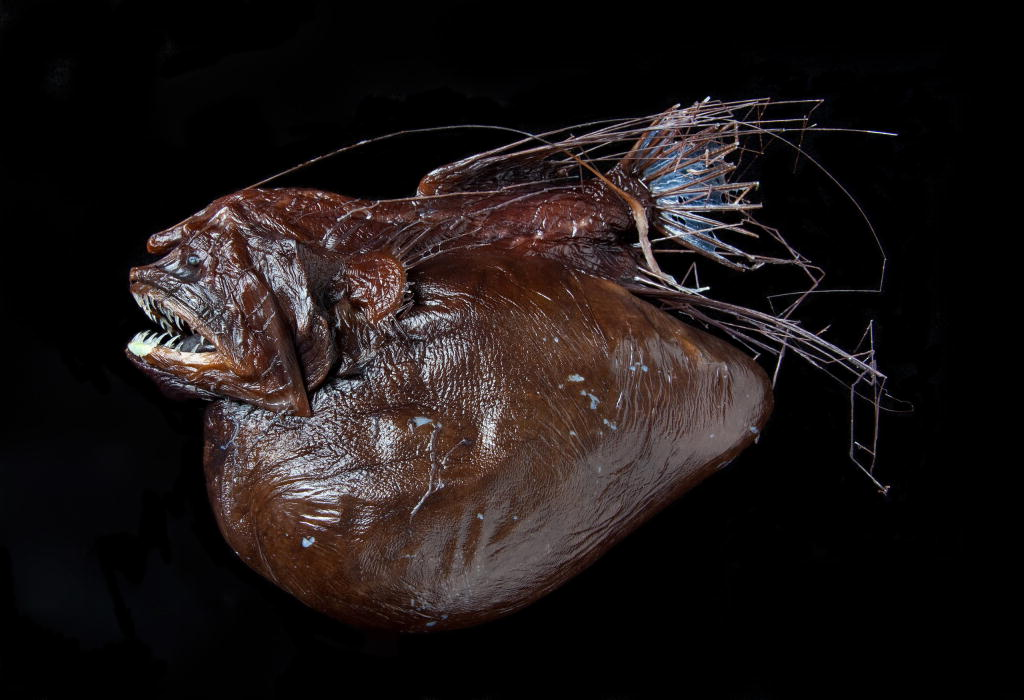
- Caulophryne pelagica

Scientific classification
- Kingdom: Animalia
- Phylum: Chordata
- Class: Actinopterygii
- Order: Lophiiformes
- Suborder: Ceratioidei
- Family: Caulophrynidae; Goode & T. H. Bean, 1896

Genera
- see text

= Fanfin =

Family of fishes

Fanfin seadevils or hairy anglerfish comprise the family Caulophrynidae, marine ray-finned fishes of the suborder Ceratioidei, the deep-sea anglerfishes. The fishes in this family are found almost around the world in the deeper, aphotic waters of the oceans.

== Taxonomy ==
The fanfin family, Caulophrynidae, was first proposed in 1896 by the American ichthyologists George Brown Goode and Tarleton Hoffman Bean. The 5th edition of Fishes of the World classifies the Caulophrynidae within the suborder Ceratioidei of the order Lophiiformes. This family was thought to be basal within the suborder Ceratioidei of the anglerfish order Lophiiformes, but phylogenetic analyses have recovered it as forming a sister taxon to the clade containing Gigantactinidae, Neoceratiidae, and Linophrynidae, and so they are deeply embedded within the suborder. However, molecular studies show that the familial relationships within the Ceratoidei are still to be fully resolved and Caulophrynidae may be the most basal taxon in the suborder.

== Etymology ==
The fanfin family, Caulophrynidae, takes its name from the genus Caulophryne. This name is a combination of caulis "stem", an allusion to the stem-like base of the illicium, and phryne "toad", a suffix commonly used in the names of anglerfish genera. Its use may date as far back as Aristotle and Cicero, who referred to anglerfishes as "fishing-frogs" and "sea-frogs", respectively, possibly because of a physical resemblance.

== Genera ==
The fanfin family, Caulophrynidae, contains the following two genera:

- Caulophryne Goode & T. H. Bean, 1896 (Fanfin seadevils)
- Robia Pietsch, 1979 (Longlure fanfins)

== Characteristics ==
Fanfins have a high degree of sexual dimorphism. The females have short, round bodies with large mouths. The lower jaw reaches back past the base of the pectoral fin. The teeth in the jaws are thin, backwards curving and depressible. They have highly elongated dorsal and anal fins, with the soft rays of these fins resembling long threads. There are 8 fin rays in the caudal fin. They do not have pelvic fins. The sensory cells of the lateral line system are at the tips of the filamentous rays of the dorsal and anal fins. They have a simple esca, or lure, which lacks a bulb but which may have filaments or appendages. The skin is naked and they do not have any dermal spines. The males are much smaller than the females and have more elongated bodies. They have large eyes and large nostrils, with large olfactory receptors. They have no teeth in the jaws, although there are tooth-like structures on the jaw bones which are used to attach to the larger female. The male do not have elongated dorsal and anal fins but so have large pectoral fins. The juveniles are the only ceratoid anglerfishes to have pelvic fins. The largest species of fanfin is Caulophryne polynema with a maximum published total length of 21 cm (8.3 in).

== Distribution and habitat ==
Fanfins are found in the Atlantic, Indian and Pacific Oceans where they live in the bathypelagic zone.

== Biology ==
Fanfins are predators on other fishes. They reproduce by means of pelagic eggs which hatch into pelagic larvae. The short, rounded larvae have swollen skin and well-developed pectoral and pelvic fins, the pelvic fins being lost as they metamorphose. Both larval males and females have a basic illicium. Metamorphosis starts at a standard length of 8 to 10 mm (0.31 to 0.39 in). The large, well-developed eyes and olfactory apparatus of the metamorphosed males are used to detect and home in on a species specific chemical released by the female to attract males. When the male finds a female he bites her and the tissue and circulatory systems of the pair may fuse; if fusion occurs he becomes a sexual parasite on the female and is nourished by her through shared blood. For the remainder of his life he may remain attached to the female and fertilises her eggs. The genus Caulophryne is thought to practice facultative sexual parasitism as specimens of C. jordani have well developed ovaries despite lacking attached males; in species which exclusively practice sexual parasitism, both sexes mature (and gonads ripen) only after fusion is achieved. This genus may be limited to one male attached at a time per female, but more evidence is needed to conclusively determine this assumption.

The genus Robia is little known as only one specimen has ever been collected, caught using an open-closing trawl from the Banda Sea at a depth of 1,000–1,500 metres (3,300–4,900 ft).
