= Stanko Karaman =

Yugoslav ichthyologist

- Born: 8 December 1889; Sarajevo, Bosnia Vilayet, Ottoman Empire
- Died: 17 May 1959 (aged 69); Skopje, PR Macedonia, FPR Yugoslavia
- Occupation: biologist

Stanko Luka Karaman (8 December 1889 – 17 May 1959) was a Yugoslav biologist of Bosnian Serb ancestry, and a researcher on amphipod and isopod crustaceans.

In 1926 he founded the Museum of South Serbia (later Macedonian Museum of Natural History) in Skopje and in 1928, the Zoological Garden of Skopje.

Several species are named after him, including Delamarella karamani Petkovski, 1957 (Harpacticoida), Stygophalangium karamani Oudemans, 1933 (Arachnida), and Macedonethes stankoi I. Karaman, 2003 (Isopoda).

Other taxa named karamani are labeled after his son Gordan S. Karaman, also a carcinologist.

== Publications ==
- Pisces Macedoniae, Split 1924 pp. 90
- Komarci Dalmacije i njihovo suzbijanje.- Glasnik Ministarstva narodnog zdravlja, Institut za proucavanje i suzbijanje malarije Trogir, Split, 1925, pp. 1–40.
