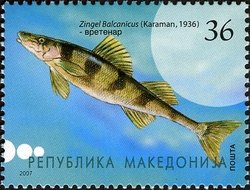

Conservation status
- Critically Endangered (IUCN 3.1)

Scientific classification
- Kingdom: Animalia
- Phylum: Chordata
- Class: Actinopterygii
- Division: Teleostei
- Order: Perciformes
- Family: Percidae
- Subfamily: Luciopercinae
- Genus: Zingel
- Species: Z. balcanicus

Binomial name
- Zingel balcanicus (Karaman, 1936)

Synonyms
- Aspro streber balcanicus Karaman, 1937; Asper streber balcanicus (Karaman, 1937)

= Zingel balcanicus =

Species of fish

Zingel balcanicus, the Vardar streber is a species of freshwater ray-finned fish in the family Percidae, the perches, ruffes, pikeperches and the darters. This species is endemic to the Vardar or Axios River in North Macedonia and its distribution may extend to the lower reaches of the river in Greece. Its biology is little known but other species in the genus Zingel require turbulent flows.

== Taxonomy ==
Zingel balcanicus was first formally described as 'Asper streber balcanicus by the Yogoslav biologist Stanko Karaman with its type locality given as the Vardar River in the Republic of North Macedonia. This taxon is now considered to be a valid species within the genus Zingel, the strebers and the zingel, within the subfamily Luciopercinae in the family Percidae.

== Etymology ==
Zingel balcanicus is classified within the genus Zingel, a name first coined by Hippolyte Cloquet as a tautonym when he proposed the genus Zingel with Cyprinus zingel as its type species, zingel is a German vernacular name for the zingel. The specific name, balcanicus, means "Balkan and refers to the type locality, the Vardar River, being located in the Balkans.

== Distribution and habitat ==
Zingel balcanicus is known only from the Beleshnica River, a small tributary of the upper Treska, itself a tributary of the Vardar in North Macedonia. In the 20th Century there were records from the main channel of the Vardar but despite being included on some checklists the presence of this species has not been confirmed in Greece. This is a rheophilic, benthic fish living in flowing, well-oxygentated water with a streambed made up of gravel, stones and boulders. It feeds on benthic invertebrates.

== Conservation ==
Zingel balcanicus is classified as Critically endangered by the International Union for Conservation of Nature. Threats to this species include damming, introduced rainbow trout and pollution. The distribution and population of the Vardar streber have declined since the mid 20th Century.
