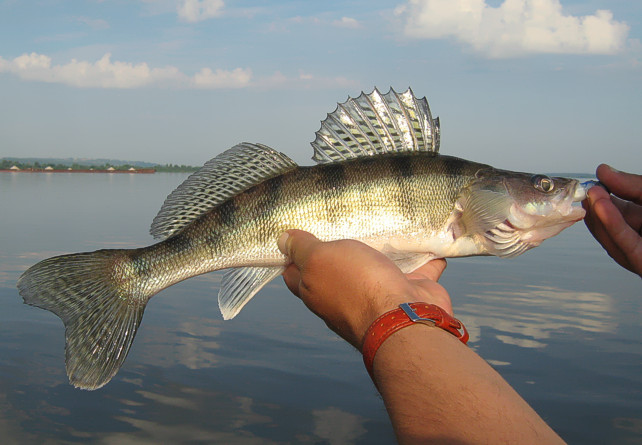

Conservation status
- Least Concern (IUCN 3.1)

Scientific classification
- Kingdom: Animalia
- Phylum: Chordata
- Class: Actinopterygii
- Order: Perciformes
- Family: Percidae
- Subfamily: Luciopercinae
- Genus: Sander
- Species: S. volgensis

Binomial name
- Sander volgensis (Gmelin, 1789)

Synonyms
- Perca volgensis Gmelin, 1789; Lucioperca sandra volgensis (Gmelin, 1789); Lucioperca volgensis (Gmelin, 1789); Sander volgense (Gmelin, 1789); Stizostedion volgensis (Gmelin, 1789); Schilus pallasii Krynicki, 1832

= Volga pikeperch =

Species of fish

The Volga pikeperch, or Volga zander (Sander volgensis), is a species of fish in the perch family Percidae. It is found in Austria, Azerbaijan, Bosnia and Herzegovina, Bulgaria, Croatia, Germany, Hungary, Moldova, Romania, Russia, Serbia, Slovakia, and Ukraine.

== Description ==
The Volga pikeperch is considerably smaller than the zander or common pike-perch (Sander lucioperca). It grows to a maximum length of 40 cm (16 in), weighing 2 kg (4.4 lb). It differs from Sander lucioperca by not having large "vampire" like canine teeth, also the colour is more silvery-grey than green, with much more distinguishable dark stripes on the side. Its second dorsal fin has nineteen to twenty-one branched soft rays and the number of scales along the lateral line is seventy to eighty-three.

== Distribution and habitat ==
The Volga pikeperch is found in the northern Black Sea basin from the Danube, as far upstream as Vienna, to the Kuban River drainages. It is also present in the Caspian Sea basin in the Volga River and Ural River drainages. It inhabits large, turbid rivers and lakes, as well as brackish estuaries and may make short migrations to breed.

== Biology ==
The Volga pikeperch is most active at dusk and dawn when it feeds on small fish and invertebrates. Males become mature by the age of three or four and females a year later, at a minimum length of 20 cm (8 in). Breeding takes place during April and May in shallow water with a sandy or gravelly bottom. The male scrapes a shallow depression in the substrate or among the roots of vegetation in which the female deposits one of two or three small batches of eggs. The larvae and juvenile fish are pelagic and feed on zooplankton.

== Taxonomy ==
The Volga pikeperch was first formally described as Perca volgensis in 1789 by the German naturalist, botanist, entomologist, herpetologist, and malacologist Johann Friedrich Gmelin (1748–1804) with the type locality given as the Volga River and the Ural River in Russia. The Volga pikeperch is part of the European clade within the genus Sander which split from a common ancestor with the North American clade, which the walleye (S. vitreus) and the sauger (S. canadensis) belong to, around 20.8 million years ago. Within the European clade the Volga pikeperch (S. volgaensis) is the most basal taxon and shares features with the North American clade, such as being a broadcast spawner. In contrast in the zander (S. lucioperca) and the estuarine perch (S. marinus) the males build nests and the female spawn into these nests and the males then guard the eggs and fry. The lineage leading to the zander is thought to have diverged from the common ancestor with the Volga pikeperch circa 13.8 million years ago.

== Status ==
The IUCN has listed the Volga pikeperch as being of "Least Concern". It has a wide range, and although the population trend is unknown, no particular threats have been identified.
