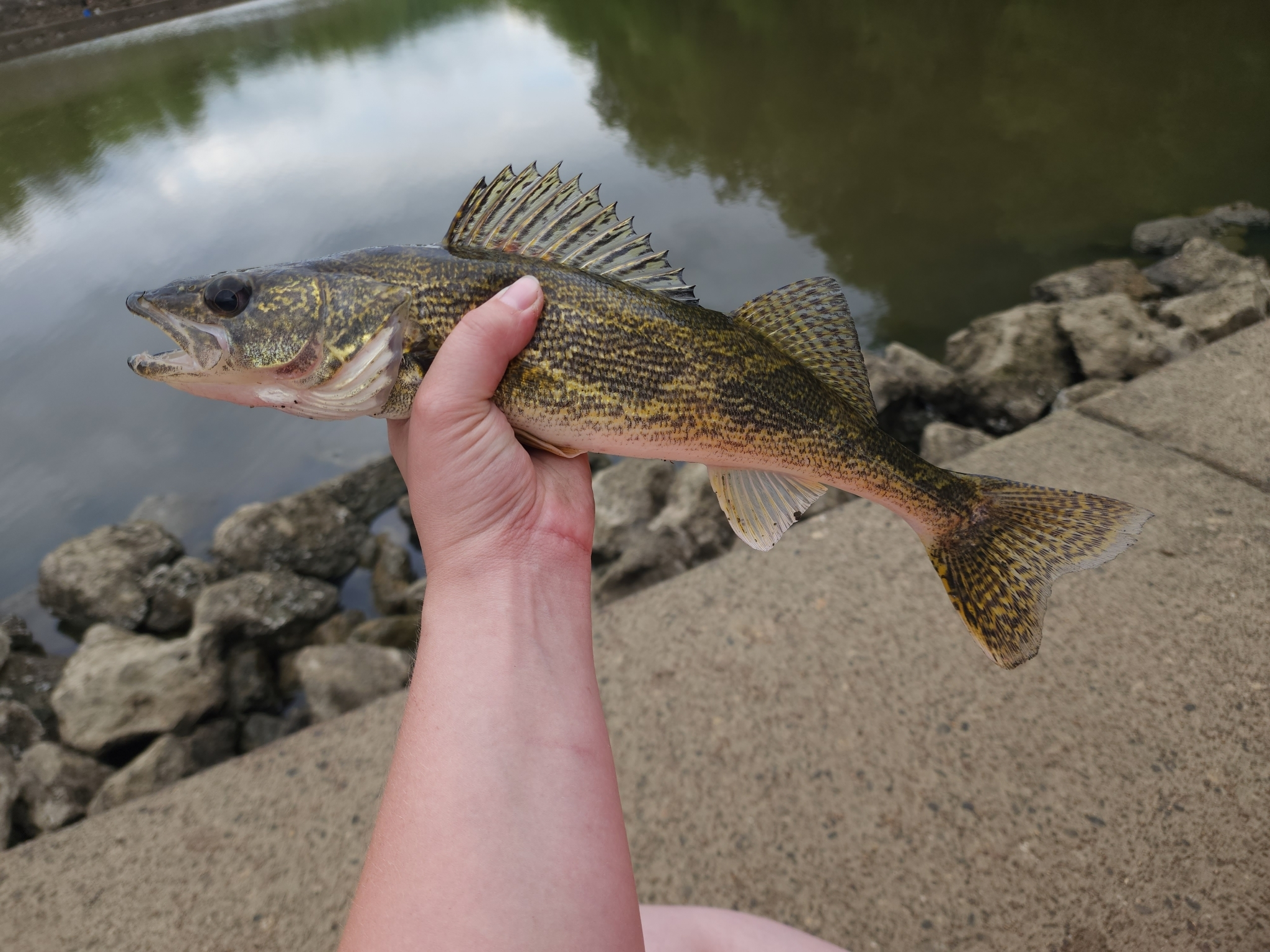

Scientific classification
- Kingdom: Animalia
- Phylum: Chordata
- Class: Actinopterygii
- Division: Teleostei
- Order: Perciformes
- Family: Percidae
- Subfamily: Luciopercinae
- Tribe: Luciopercini
- Genus: Sander
- Species: S. canadensis × S. vitreus

= Saugeye =

Hybrid species of fish

The saugeye (Sander canadensis × vitreus) is a hybrid freshwater fish between walleye (Sander viterus) and sauger (Sander canadensis) of the family Percidae. They are commonly stocked in the midwestern United States for recreational angling.

== Description ==
The color of saugeye varies from olive green to gold but most individuals exhibit distinct dark saddles extending across the body. Additionally, saugeye exhibit distinct streaks across the dorsal fin that frequently have one to two rows of spots along the base. Sauger will have multiple rows of spots while walleye only exhibit indistinct crescents across the dorsal fin. Saugeye are difficult to identify based on external characteristics alone due to their similarity with both parent species. For example, 27% of presumed walleye sampled in the Ohio River were later determined to be saugeye through genetic techniques.

== Diet ==
Like walleye and sauger, saugeye are predominantly piscivorous. Prey consumed ultimately depends on location and prey availability, but saugeye diets primarily consist of centrarchids, cyprinids, and clupeids. In many cases, saugeye are stocked to utilize abundant gizzard shad, a prey item they readily consume.

== Reproduction ==
Saugeye are produced by crossing the eggs from a female walleye and sperm from a male sauger.

== Management ==
Saugeye are raised in hatcheries and stocked throughout the United States to provide an additional fishery opportunity for recreational anglers in reservoirs, rivers, and tailwaters. Some states that have stocked saugeye include Ohio, Tennessee, Colorado, and Nebraska. Some saugeye stockings occur where habitat is considered too warm or eutrophic for walleye, therefore saugeye are expected to perform better.

In some waterbodies, saugeye occur naturally and backcross with sauger or walleye.
