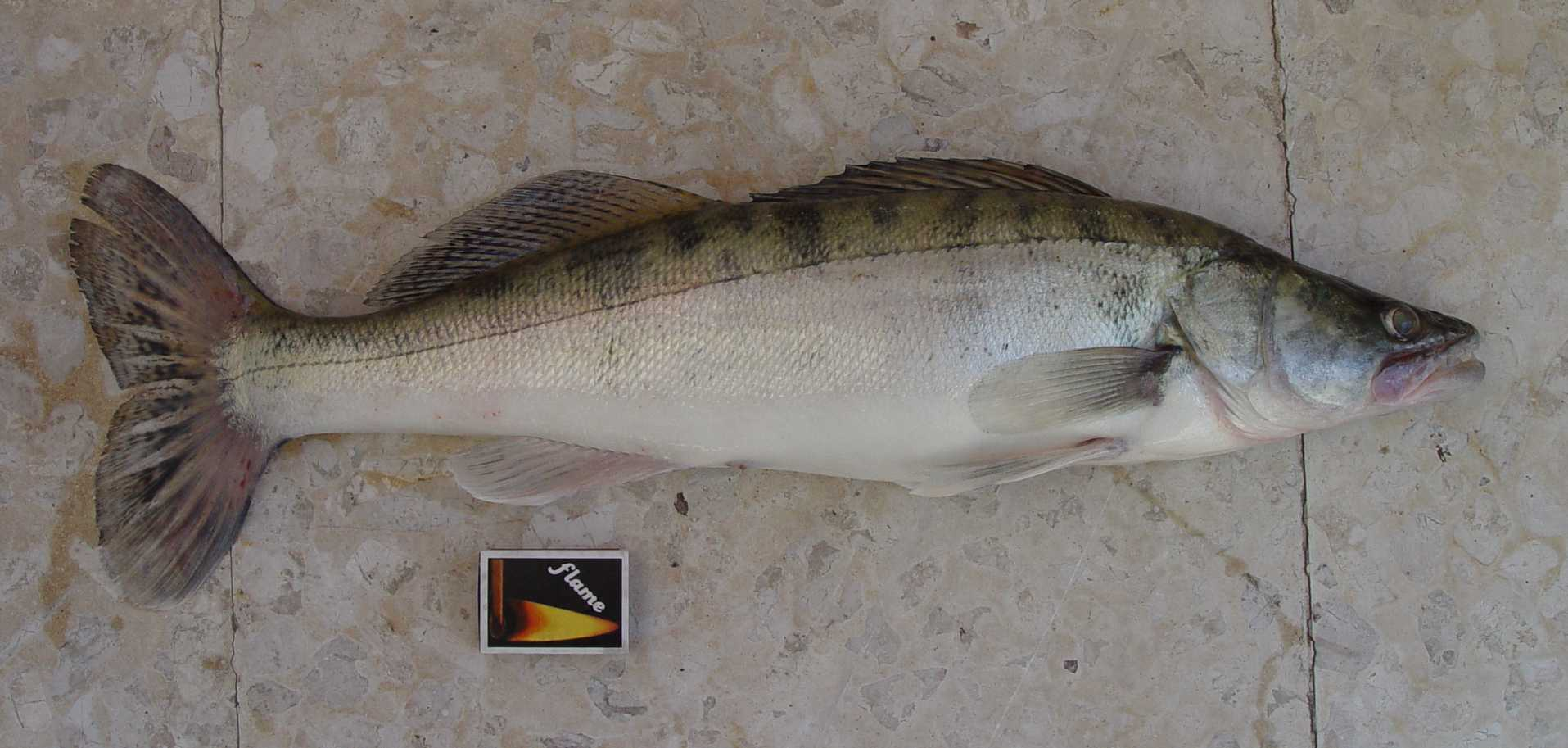

Conservation status
- Least Concern (IUCN 3.1)

Scientific classification
- Kingdom: Animalia
- Phylum: Chordata
- Class: Actinopterygii
- Division: Teleostei
- Order: Perciformes
- Family: Percidae
- Subfamily: Luciopercinae
- Genus: Sander
- Species: S. lucioperca

Binomial name
- Sander lucioperca (Linnaeus, 1758)

Synonyms
- Perca lucioperca Linnaeus, 1758; Lucioperca lucioperca (Linnaeus, 1758); Stizostedion lucioperca (Linnaeus, 1758); Centropomus sandat Lacépède, 1802; Lucioperca sandra Cuvier, 1828; Lucioperca linnei Malm, 1877

= Zander =

Zander Temporal range: Late Miocene to recent

Species of fish

The zander (Sander lucioperca), sander, pikeperch, or Eurasian pikeperch, is a species of ray-finned fish from the family Percidae (which also includes perch, ruffe and darter). It is found in freshwater and brackish habitats in western Eurasia. As a popular game fish, it has been introduced to a variety of localities outside its native range. It is the type species of the genus Sander.

== Taxonomy ==
The zander was first formally described in 1758 as Perca lucioperca by Carolus Linnaeus in volume 1 of the tenth edition of Systema Naturae, and he gave the type locality as "European lakes". When Lorenz Oken (1779–1851) created the genus Sander, he made Perca lucioperca its type species. The zander is part of the European clade within the genus Sander, which split from a common ancestor with the North American clade, which the walleye (S. vitreus) and the sauger (S. canadensis) belong to, around 20.8 million years ago. Within the European clade the Volga pikeperch (S. volgaensis) is the most basal taxon and shares features with the North American clade, such as being a broadcast spawner. In contrast in the zander and the estuarine perch (S. marinus), the males build nests, the females spawn into these nests, and the males then guard the eggs and fry. The lineage leading to the zander is thought to have diverged from the common ancestor with the Volga pikeperch circa 13.8 million years ago, while the split from the estuarine perch took place around 9.1 million years ago.

Fossil remains of S. lucioperca are known from the Late Miocene and Pliocene of Ukraine. They appear to have coexisted with the extinct pikeperches Sander svetovidovi and Leobergia.

== Description ==
The zander is the largest member of the Percidae. It usually has a long and muscular body which bears some resemblance to a Northern pike (Esox lucius), hence the alternative English common name of pikeperch.

The upper part of its body is green-brown in colour, and this extends onto the sides as dark vertical bars, in a pattern not dissimilar to that of the European perch (Perca fluviatilis), while the lower part of the body is creamy-white. The caudal fin is dark, and the pectoral, pelvic and anal fins are paler off-white. The dorsal and caudal fins are marked with rows of black spots on the membranes between the spines and rays; these are largest and most obvious on the first dorsal fin. The juveniles are silvery in colour, becoming darker as they age. They have powerful jaws armed with many sharp teeth, with two long canines in the front of each jaw. They have large, bulbous eyes which are opaque when the fish is living in particularly turbid conditions, an adaptation to low light. There is a single flat spine on the operculum. Like other members of the perch family, the zander has a split dorsal fin, with the first dorsal fin having 13–20 spines and 18–24 soft rays, while the anal fin has 2–3 rays and 10–14 soft rays. The caudal fin is long and forked.

The zander has a maximum published standard length of 100 centimetres (39 in), although they are more commonly found at around 50 centimetres (20 in). This species can weigh up to 15 kg (33 lb), although typical catches are considerably smaller. The IGFA All-Tackle world record zander was caught in Lago Maggiore, Switzerland in June 2016, weighing 11.48 kg (25.3 lb). Zander reach an average length of 40–80 cm (15.5–31.5 in) with a maximum length of 120 cm (47 in).

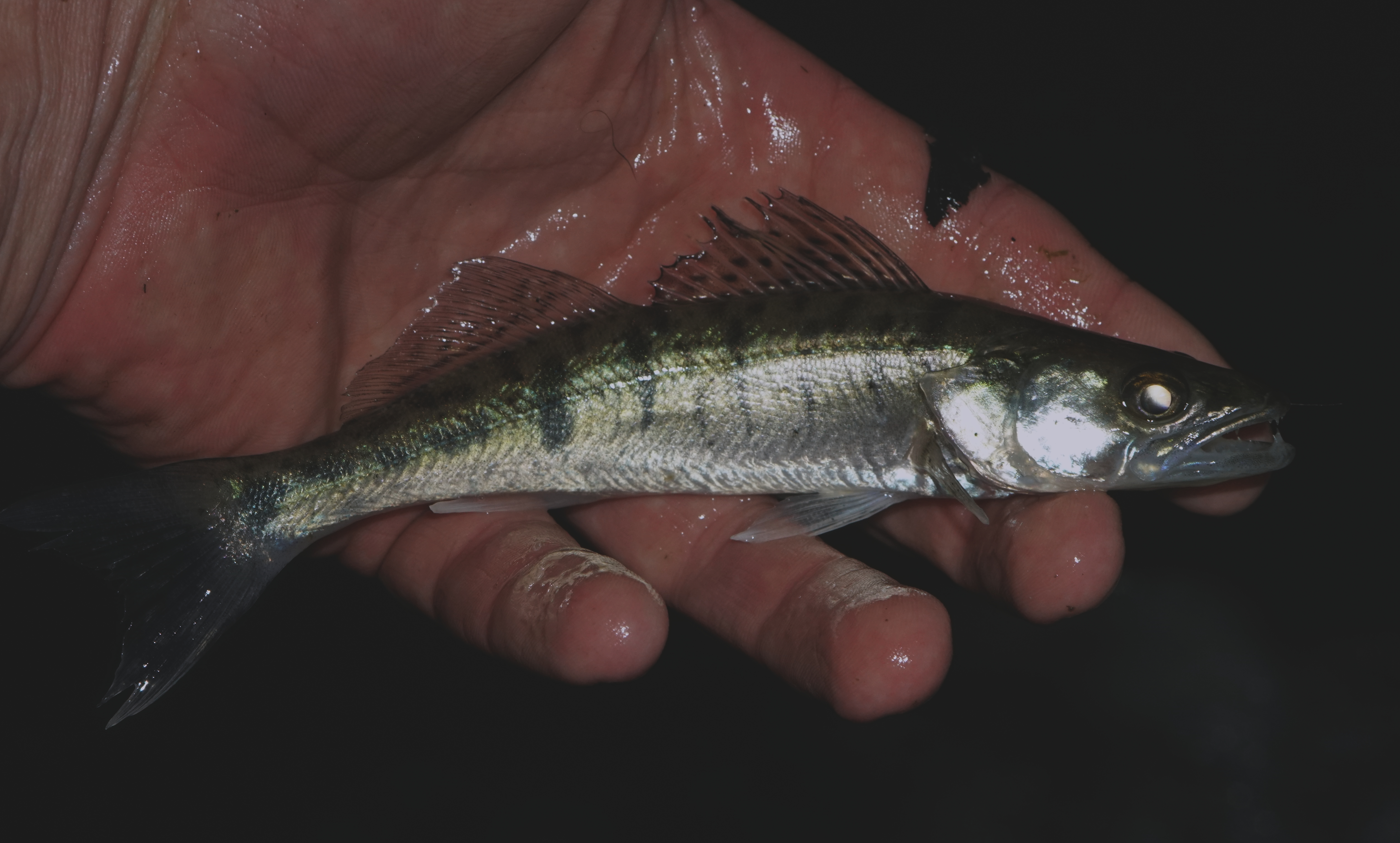
Juvenile Zander may have a stripe pattern

== Distribution ==
The zander is very widely distributed across Eurasia, occurring in the drainages of the Caspian, Baltic, Black, Aral, North and Aegean Sea basins. The northern boundary of its distribution is in Finland. It has been introduced to Great Britain, southern Europe, and continental Europe west of the Elbe, Ebro, Tagus and Jucar drainages, as well as to Anatolia, North Africa, Siberia, Kyrgyzstan, and Kazakhstan.

In the UK, zander was originally introduced in 1878 by Francis Russell, 9th Duke of Bedford, into lakes on his Woburn Abbey estate and soon after that into the Great Ouse Relief Channel in The Fens. British Waterways included zander among a "dirty dozen" non-native species most likely to harm native wildlife along rivers in Great Britain.

Their success in establishing themselves owes to a number of factors, one of which is that they are particularly well adapted to life in the slow-flowing, sparsely vegetated, rather murky waters that comprise so many of the British lowland rivers. Zander thrive in water with rather low visibility, unlike pike, which often dominate the predator fish niche in clear water. However, zander need plenty of oxygen and soon disappear from eutrophic areas.

Zander were stocked in Spiritwood Lake, North Dakota in 1989 and have remained ever since. Ecologists believe that if establishment occurs in the Great Lakes they will compete with game fish such as the closely related walleye or yellow perch for food and habitat. Therefore the Government of Ontario is preemptively treating zander as a future invasive species.

In the Netherlands, zander may be found (natively) in many major waterways, including the Waal, Hollands Diep, and other distributaries or estuaries of the Rhine, and are also particularly common in the canals of Amsterdam.

== Habitat and biology ==
=== Habitat ===
Zander inhabit freshwater bodies, especially large rivers and eutrophic lakes. They can tolerate brackish water and will make use of coastal lakes and estuaries. Individuals living in brackish water habitats migrate upriver, as far as 250 kilometres (160 miles) for spawning.

=== Diet ===
Zander are carnivorous and the adults feed on smaller schooling fish. Studies around the Baltic Sea have found them to prey on the European smelt (Osmerus eperlanus), ruffe (Gymnocephalus cernua), European perch, vendace (Coregonus albula) and the common roach (Rutilus rutilus). They cannibalize smaller zanders. They have also been recorded feeding on smolts of sea trout (Salmo trutta morph. trutta) and Atlantic salmon (Salmo salar). In the United Kingdom, zander thrive in canals, where the water is turbid due to boat traffic. Although their favoured prey in these waters is the common roach, they have a high impact on the population of gudgeon (Gobio gobio).

=== Reproduction ===
The zander spawns over gravel in flowing water. The males defend a territory in which they dig shallow depressions in sand or gravel which are roughly 50 centimetres (20 in) across and 5–10 centimetres (2.0–3.9 in) in depth. They will also nest among exposed plant roots, onto which the eggs are laid. The nests are normally at depths of 1 to 3 metres (39 to 118 in) in turbid water. Spawning takes place in pairs, at night and at daybreak. When they are spawning, the female is stationary above the male's nest, and the male rapidly swims around her, keeping a distance of around 1 metre (3.3 ft) from the nesting depression. The male then orients himself perpendicular to the substrate and the pair swim around swiftly, releasing the eggs and sperm. The female departs after releasing her eggs. The male remains at the nest and defends it, fanning the eggs using the pectoral fins. Each female lays all of her eggs at once, and only spawns once a year. The larvae are attracted to light, and after they leave the nest they feed on zooplankton and small pelagic animals. Their normal spawning season is in April and May, although exceptionally they may spawn from late February through to July, and the actual period depends on latitude and altitude. The determining factor is that the temperature needs to reach 10–14 °C (50–57 °F) before spawning starts.

=== Life history ===
Zander have a maximum lifespan of 17 years. They are sexually mature at 3–10 years old, with 4 years old being typical.

=== Parasites and predators ===
A large number of parasites are known to infect the zander's skin, eyes and internal organs. Its gastrointestinal tract can host the nematode Anisakis, which can be transmitted to humans if the fish is smoked, fried or otherwise cooked at temperatures lower than 50 °C (122 °F). The zander is also a vector of the trematode Bucephalus polymorphus and may have been responsible for spreading the parasite to some French river systems during the 1960s and 1970s, leading to decreases in populations of native cyprinids.

Recorded predators of the zander include other zanders, as well as European eels (Anguilla anguilla), Northern pike, European perch, the wels catfish (Silurus glanis) and the Caspian seal (Phoca caspia).

== Use by humans ==
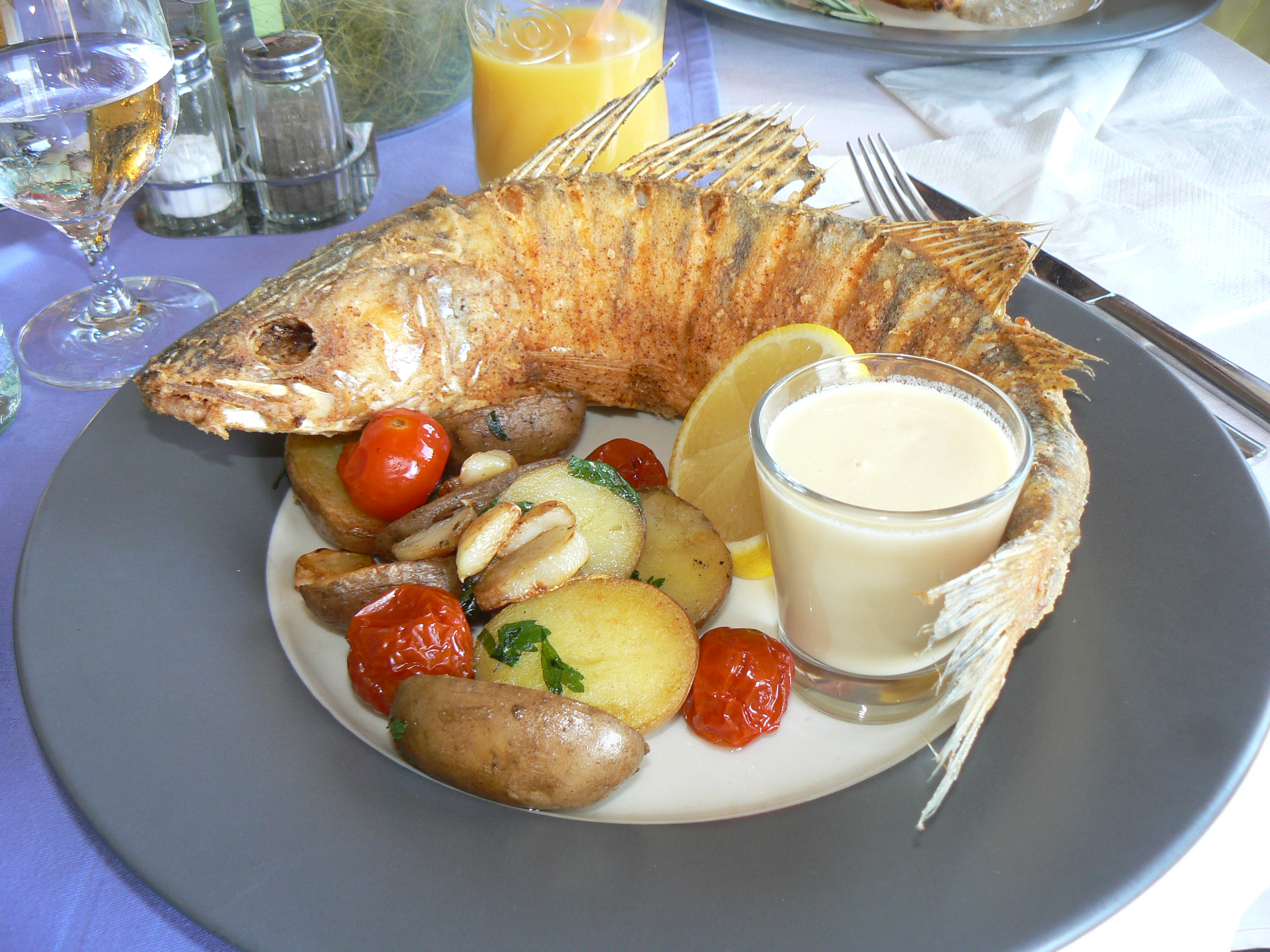
Whole baked zander served in a restaurant in Balatonfüred, Hungary

The zander is considered one of the most valuable food fish native to Europe. It is esteemed for its light, firm but tender meat with few bones and a delicate flavour. Although it is not generally bred for food, its adaptability makes zander fishery quite sustainable. Indeed, in some regions the release of young zanders is restricted, as natural stocks already provide a sufficient supply for the market, while boosting the population of this large predator would have an adverse effect on populations of its prey.

Zander is especially well suited for fish fillets. It can also be served whole, baked, smoked or cooked. In some culinary circles, zander is appreciated more highly than salmon. Even the offals can be cooked into consommé.

In 2004, it was revealed that some restaurants in the Minneapolis-St. Paul area of Minnesota were serving imported zander instead of the closely related North American walleye (the state fish, and a popular food in the region). While zander and walleye are almost indistinguishable by taste, the restaurants were selling the European fish under the name "walleye", which is an illegal practice. An investigation by the U.S. Food and Drug Administration followed.

In Ohio, many restaurants were caught using juvenile zander fillets in the 40 to 80 gram range in place of the Lake Erie yellow perch. Shortages of the perch along with skyrocketing prices caused wholesalers and restaurants to use the juvenile zander for popular "pike perch fillets".

A zander in the coat of arms of Kuortane

In Finland, as a conservation measure, the law regulates the minimum size of zander considered mature enough to be eaten.

In July 2009, in a rare occurrence, a zander bit bathers swimming in the Swiss part of Lake Maggiore, sending two people to the emergency room; the worst bite inflicted a wound about 10 centimeters long. The 70-cm 8-kg fish was later caught by the local police, who cooked it and offered it to the tourists for the trouble it caused.

As the largest member of the perch family, zander is a popular game fish in the United Kingdom. However, its status as non-native invasive species means there are strict legal restrictions: any zander caught by anglers in the UK cannot be returned to the water, and must be destroyed.

=== Aquaculture ===
Increasing demand for zander for human consumption has attracted great attention of fish farmers. Today, elaborated protocols for the reproduction and on-growing of zander are available. Throughout Europe, an increasing number of aquaculture facilities produce zander for stocking or human consumption, mainly in recirculating aquaculture systems (RAS). Production volume remains low, but is expected to increase. High investment and maintenance costs of RAS require farming of high value species with good market acceptance such as zander.
