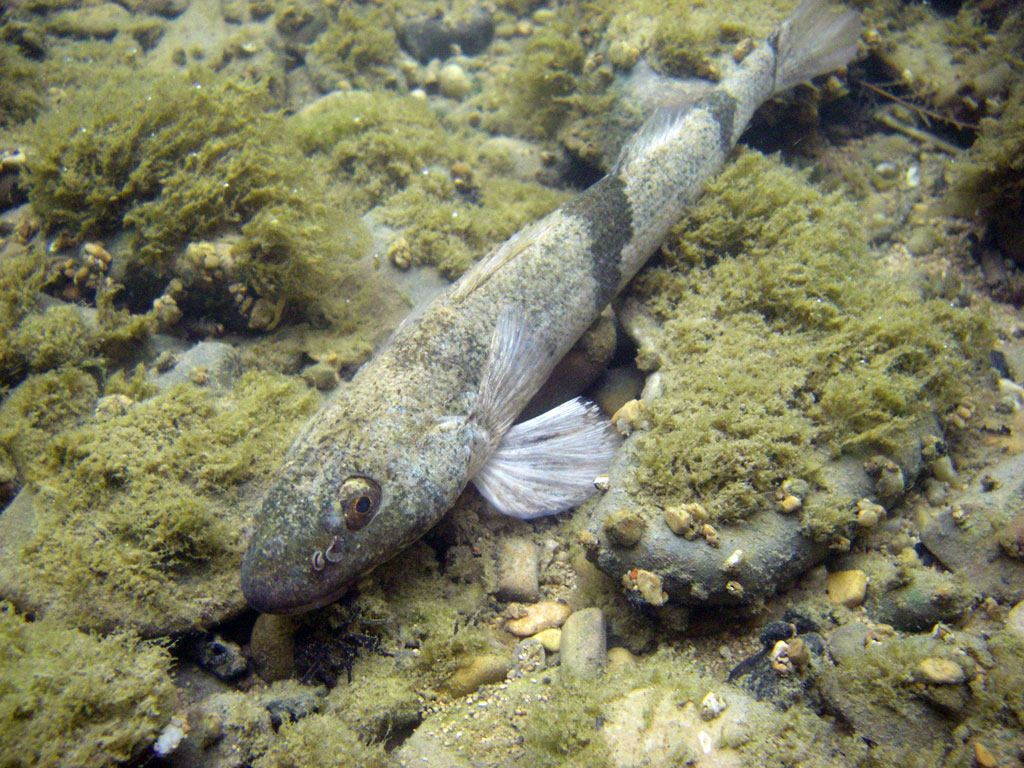

Conservation status
- Endangered (IUCN 3.1)

Scientific classification
- Kingdom: Animalia
- Phylum: Chordata
- Class: Actinopterygii
- Division: Teleostei
- Order: Perciformes
- Family: Percidae
- Subfamily: Luciopercinae
- Genus: Zingel
- Species: Z. asper

Binomial name
- Zingel asper (Linnaeus, 1758)

Synonyms
- Perca asper Linnaeus, 1758; Aspro vulgaris Cuvier, 1828; Aspro apron Siebold, 1863

= Zingel asper =

Species of fish

Zingel asper, also known as the Rhone streber, is a species of freshwater ray-finned fish in the family Percidae that is at a high risk of becoming extinct due to habitat destruction and pollution. It is endemic to the rivers Durance and Beaume in the Rhône basin in France and Switzerland.

== Diet and habitat ==
The asper's diet consists of small insects which include flies (Diptera), mayflies (Baetidae), and caddisflies (Hydropsychidae), and varies by season, with flies consumed primarily during the winter.

Zingel asper can be found in the rivers Durance and Beaume. Zingel asper lives in habitats similar to that of the loach, Cobitis calderoni, and the common minnow (Phoxinus phoxinus). It lurks on the stone bottoms of fast-flowing rivers in the day, coming out at night to feed on aquatic vertebrates. It reaches its full maturity after one year, and its length ranges from 10 to 20 cm (4 to 8 in).

Breeding takes place in the deeper parts of riffles. Spawn is deposited on gravel and the eggs stick to the substrate and hatch in about fourteen days. The fertility of Zingel asper is related to its size.

== Status ==
There are four populations of Zingel asper. The subpopulations in the Durance, with 200 fish per hectare, and the Beaume, with 80 fish per hectare, are relatively stable, but the Drôme population is small and the population in the river Doubs is estimated to number between 80 and 160. The IUCN rates this species as being "Endangered". Its total population is declining and this is thought to be due to the fragmentation of its populations and the modification and destruction of its habitat due to the construction of dams and the pollution of water.

== Taxonomy ==
Zingel asper was first formally described as Perca asper by Linnaeus in 1758 with its type locality given as the river Rhône.
