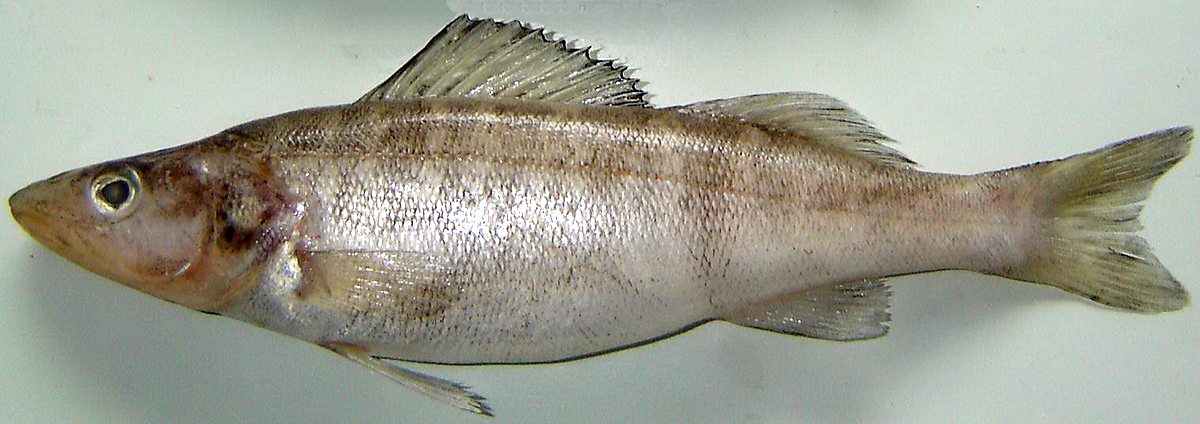

Conservation status
- Least Concern (IUCN 3.1)

Scientific classification
- Kingdom: Animalia
- Phylum: Chordata
- Class: Actinopterygii
- Order: Perciformes
- Family: Percidae
- Subfamily: Luciopercinae
- Genus: Sander
- Species: S. marinus

Binomial name
- Sander marinus (Cuvier, 1828)

Synonyms
- Lucioperca marina Cuvier, 1828; Stizostedion marinum (Cuvier, 1828)

= Sander marinus =

Species of fish

Sander marinus, the estuarine perch, sea pikeperch or sea zander, is a species of brackish water ray-finned fish belonging to the family Percidae which includes the perches, ruffes and darters. It is found in eastern Europe in the Black Sea and the Caspian Sea.

== Taxonomy ==
Sander marinus was first formally described as Lucioperca marina in 1828 by the French zoologist Georges Cuvier with its type locality given as the Black Sea and Caspian Sea. The estuarine perch is now classified in the genus Sander within the subfamily Luciopercinae, this subfamily also including the genera Zingel and Romanichthys, of the family Percidae.

== Etymology ==
Sander marinus is classified within the genus Sander; this name is a latinisation of Cuvier's les Sandres, which he derived from zander, the German vernacular name for the zander (Sander lucioperca). The specific name, marinus, means "of the sea", and refers to this species being found in the brackish waters of the CAspian and Black Seas in comparison to the freshwater S. lucioperca.

== Description ==
Sander marinus is told apart from the other European members of its genus by the counts of branched fin rays in the second dorsal fin, the width of its forehead and the number of scales in its lateral line. This species has between 12 and 14 branched rays in the second dorsal fin and between 79 and 85 scales along its lateral line,

== Distribution and habitat ==
Sander marinus is found in the Black Sea and the Caspian Sea. It lives in brackish waters and spawns in the seas but will enter rivers. The estuarine perch prefers shallow coastal water, down to 35 m (115 ft) with a rocky seabed.

== Biology ==
Sander marinus is a predator of invertebrates and smaller fishes. These fishes attain sexual maturity at 3 or 4 years old, the spawning season is in April and May and the spawn is laid on hard substrates. After spawning is complete, these fishes begin to feed intensively before the water temperature declines in the coastal waters and with the onset of winter they retreat to deeper waters.

== Fishing ==
Sander marinus is a commercially targeted species but it is not highly valued as the flesh is considered somewhat unpalatable.
