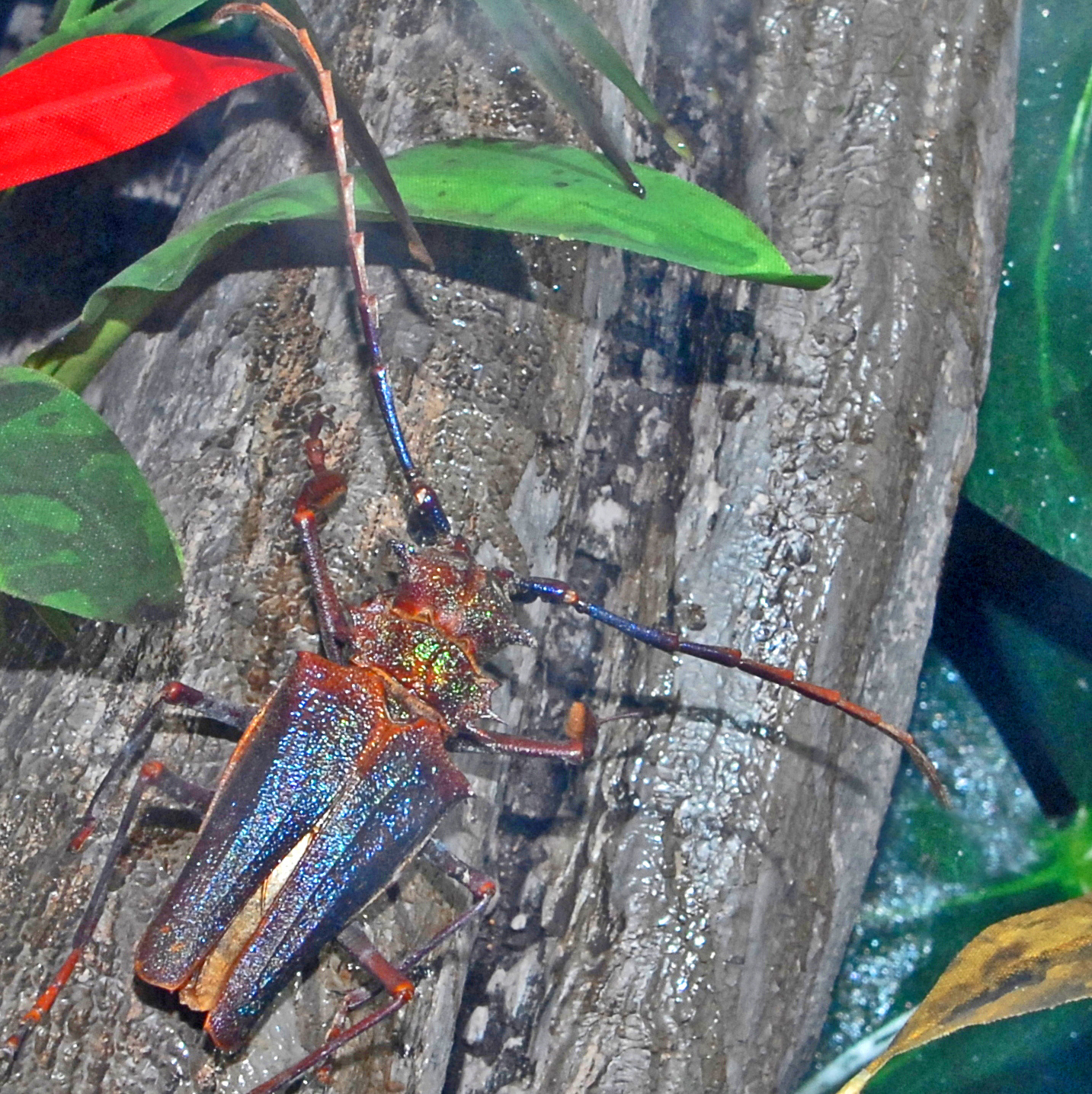

Scientific classification
- Domain: Eukaryota
- Kingdom: Animalia
- Phylum: Arthropoda
- Class: Insecta
- Order: Coleoptera
- Suborder: Polyphaga
- Infraorder: Cucujiformia
- Family: Cerambycidae
- Genus: Psalidognathus
- Species: P. friendii

Binomial name
- Psalidognathus friendii Gray in Griffith, 1831

= Psalidognathus friendii =

Species of beetle

Psalidognathus friendii is a species of beetle belonging to the family Cerambycidae.

== Description ==
Psalidognathus friendii can reach a length of 66 millimetres (2.6 in). The surface of the elytra may be metallic brown, green or bluish. The head and the prothorax are spiny and the mandibles are very large.

== Distribution ==
This species can be found in Colombia, Venezuela, Peru, Ecuador and Bolivia.
