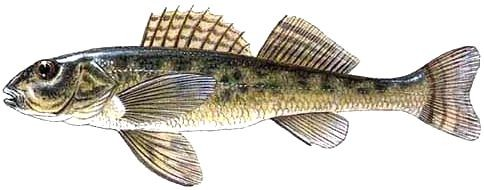
- Asprete Romanichthys valsanicola

Scientific classification
- Kingdom: Animalia
- Phylum: Chordata
- Class: Actinopterygii
- Order: Perciformes
- Family: Percidae
- Subfamily: Luciopercinae
- Tribe: Romanichthyini; Dumitrescu, Bănărescu & Stoica 1957

Genera
- See text

= Romanichthyini =

Tribe of fishes

Romanichthyini is a tribe of freshwater ray-finned fish which is one of two tribes in the subfamily Luciopercinae, which in turn is classified under the family Percidae, the family also includes the perches, pikeperches, ruffes and darters.

== Taxonomy ==
The Romanichthyini is the sister taxon to the tribe Luciopercini and together they form the subfamily Luciopercinae.

There are two genera classified within the tribe, although there is evidence to suggest that it may be a single genus and that the asprete should be classified within Zingel. Apart from one species which is found in the Rhone the species in the tribe are endemic to the Danube basin.

The two genera are:

- Romanichthys Dumitrescu, Bănărescu & Stoica 1957
- Zingel Cloquet, 1817
