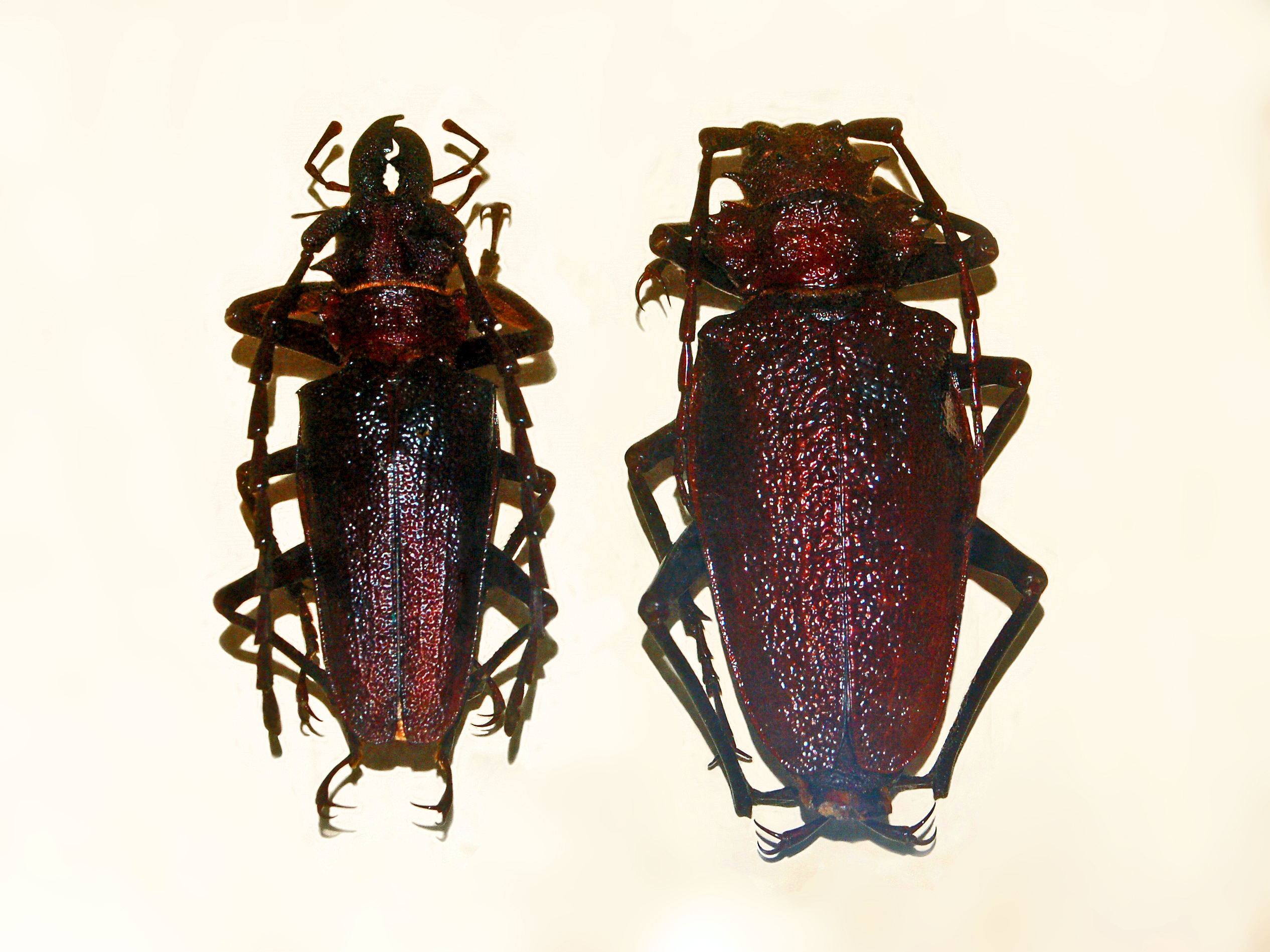
- Psalidognathus modestus from Colombia. Male and female

Scientific classification
- Domain: Eukaryota
- Kingdom: Animalia
- Phylum: Arthropoda
- Class: Insecta
- Order: Coleoptera
- Suborder: Polyphaga
- Infraorder: Cucujiformia
- Family: Cerambycidae
- Subfamily: Prioninae
- Tribe: Prionini
- Genus: Psalidognathus; Gray in Griffith, 1831

= Psalidognathus =

Genus of beetles

Psalidognathus is a genus of beetles belonging to the family Cerambycidae.

== List of species ==
- Psalidognathus antonkozlovi Noguchi & Santos-Silva, 2016
- Psalidognathus cerberus Santos-Silva & Komiya, 2012
- Psalidognathus deyrollei Thomson, 1877
- Psalidognathus erythrocerus Reiche, 1840
- Psalidognathus friendi Gray, 1831
- Psalidognathus modestus Salazar, 2005
- Psalidognathus onorei Quentin & Villiers, 1983
- Psalidognathus pubescens Quentin & Villiers, 1983
- Psalidognathus reichei Quentin & Villiers, 1983
- Psalidognathus rufescens Quentin & Villiers, 1983
- Psalidognathus sallei Thomson, 1859
- Psalidognathus thomsoni Lameere, 1885
- Psalidognathus vershinini Zubov & Titarenko, 2019
