= Ghizil-Agaj State Reserve =

Coordinates: 39°06′06″N 49°00′55″E

Designations

Ramsar Wetland
- Official name: Ghizil-Agaj
- Designated: 21 May 2001
- Reference no.: 1076

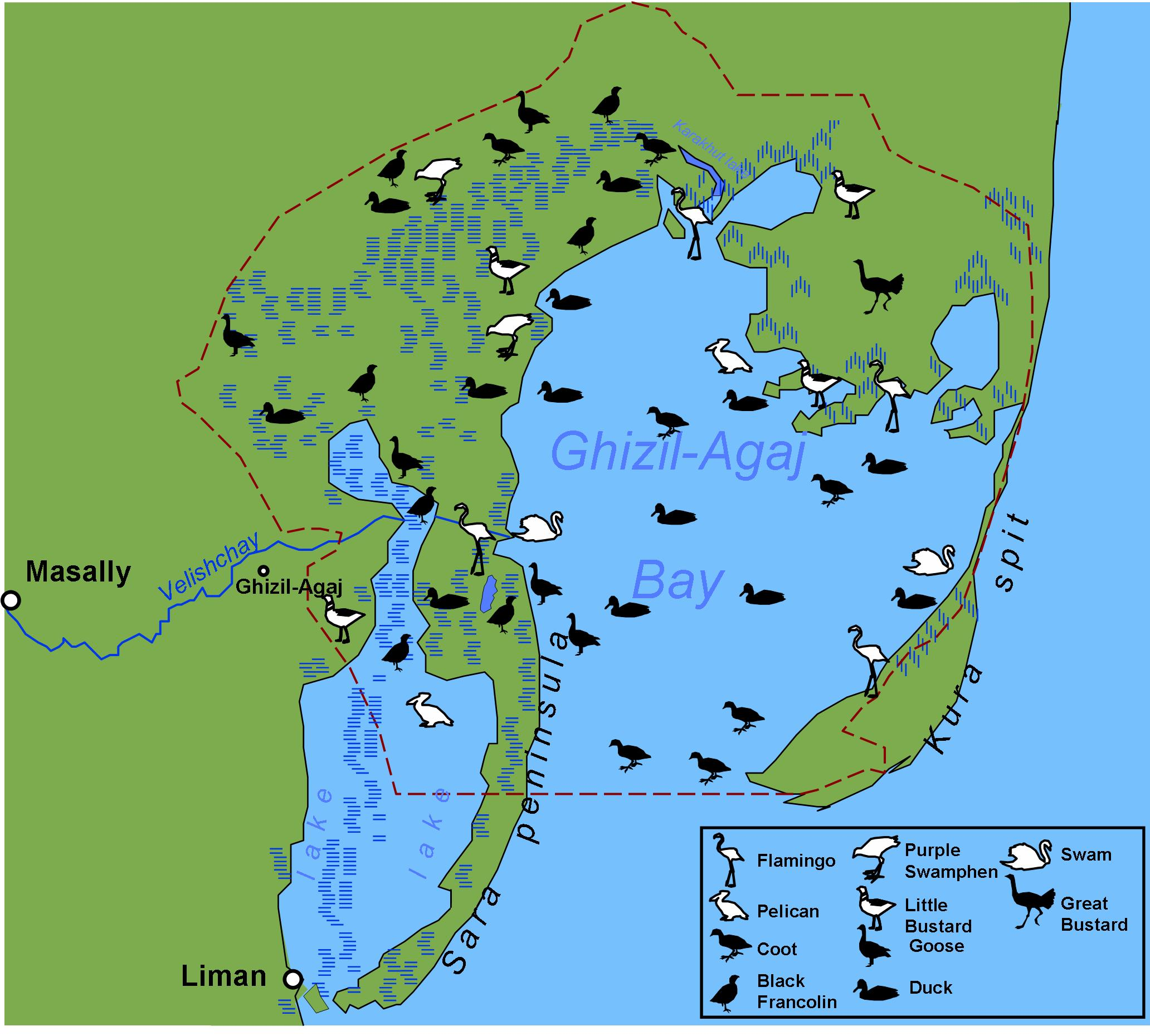
Birds of Ghizil-Agaj State Reserve

Ghzil-Aghaj State Reserve (Azerbaijani: Qızılağac dövlət qoruğu), meaning golden tree, was established on July 3, 1929, by the Committee on Protection of the Ancient and Art Monuments of Azerbaijan on an area of 884 km^{2} on Ghizil-Agaj Bay at the southwestern shore of the Caspian Sea, in Lankaran District, southeastern Azerbaijan.

== Creation ==
Ghizil-Aghaj State Reserve was created for protecting and creating conditions for wintering and nesting of migrant, swamp and wild birds in 1929. Along with the reserve, there is also the Little Qizil-Aghaj State Nature Protected area with a total area of 10,700 ha. Qizil-Aghaj is biggest reserve in the country according to area, and the third according to date of establishment.

The reserve was included in the list of UNESCO Ramsar convention "On internationally important swampy areas as the birds' residing places" together with Ag-Gel National Park.

== Flora and fauna ==
Most species of birds included in the Red Book of Azerbaijan are found in the reserve and adjacent areas. The reserve accounts for 248 species of birds. Such mammals as wild boar, wolf, wild cat, badger, sable, fox, etc. populate this reserve. There are 54 fish species including clupea, caspian kutum, common carp, wels catfish, sander marinus, common bream, flathead grey mullet in the water basins of this reserve.

=== Birds ===
The list of birds of the reserve, listed in the Red Book of Azerbaijan
| Picture | Name (local name) | Scientific name | Picture | Name (local name) | Scientific name |
|---|---|---|---|---|---|
| | Greater flamingo (Qızılqaz) | Phoenicopterus roseus | | Little bustard (Bəzgək) | Tetrax tetrax |
| | Great white pelican (Çəhrayı qutan) | Pelecanus onocrotalus | | Grey-headed swamphen (Sultan toyuğu) | Porphyrio poliocephalus |
| | Dalmatian pelican (Qıvrımlələk qutan) | Pelecanus crispus | | Red-breasted goose (Qırmızıdöş qaz) | Branta ruficollis |
| | Black stork (Qara leylək) | Ciconia nigra | | Marbled duck (Mərmər cürə) | Marmaronetta angustirostris |
| | Eurasian spoonbill (Ərsindimdik) | Platalea leucorodia | | Mute swan (Fısıldayan qu) | Cygnus olor |
| | White-tailed eagle (Ağquyruq dəniz qartalı) | Haliaeetus albicilla | | Bewick's swan (Kiçik qu) | Cygnus columbianus bewickii |
| | Eastern imperial eagle (Məzar qartalı) | Aquila heliaca | | Sociable lapwing (Qırıldayan cüllüt) | Vanellus gregarius |
| | Golden eagle (Berkut) | Aquila chrysaetos | | White-tailed lapwing (Ağquyruq çökükburun) | Vanellus leucurus |
| | Black francolin (Turac) | Francolinus francolinus | | Collared pratincole (Çöl haçaquyruq cüllütü) | Glareola pratincola |
| | Great bustard (Dovdaq) | Otis tarda | | | |

== See also ==
- Gizilaghaj National Park
- Nature of Azerbaijan
- National Parks of Azerbaijan
- State Reserves of Azerbaijan
- State Game Reserves of Azerbaijan
- Kura Island
- Ghizil-Agaj Bay
