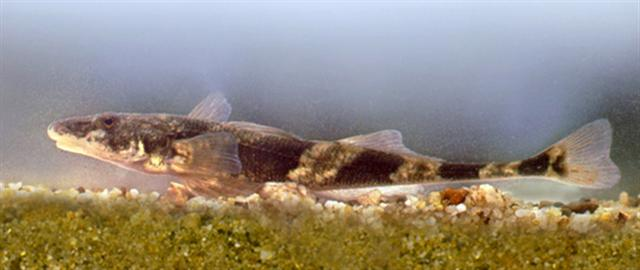

Conservation status
- Least Concern (IUCN 3.1)

Scientific classification
- Kingdom: Animalia
- Phylum: Chordata
- Class: Actinopterygii
- Order: Perciformes
- Family: Percidae
- Subfamily: Luciopercinae
- Genus: Zingel
- Species: Z. streber

Binomial name
- Zingel streber (Siebold, 1863)

Synonyms
- Aspro streber Siebold, 1863; Asper verus Schaeffer, 1761

= Streber =

Species of fish

The streber (Zingel streber), also known as the Danube streber, is a species of freshwater ray-finned fish in the family Percidae. It is found in strongly flowing waters in the Danube and Dniester drainages of Austria, Bosnia and Herzegovina, Bulgaria, Croatia, the Czech Republic, Germany, Greece, Hungary, Italy, Moldova, Serbia, Slovakia, Slovenia, Switzerland, and Ukraine.

== Breeding ==
This species spawns between March and May. The eggs are scattered on clean gravel substrate. Both sexes develop unusual nuptial tubercles: males with one or two pointed tubercles per scale in the head region, and those on the body being aligned into several prominent ridges from head to tail. Females lack these sexual ornaments on the head, but still have the ridges, albeit less prominently than the males.
