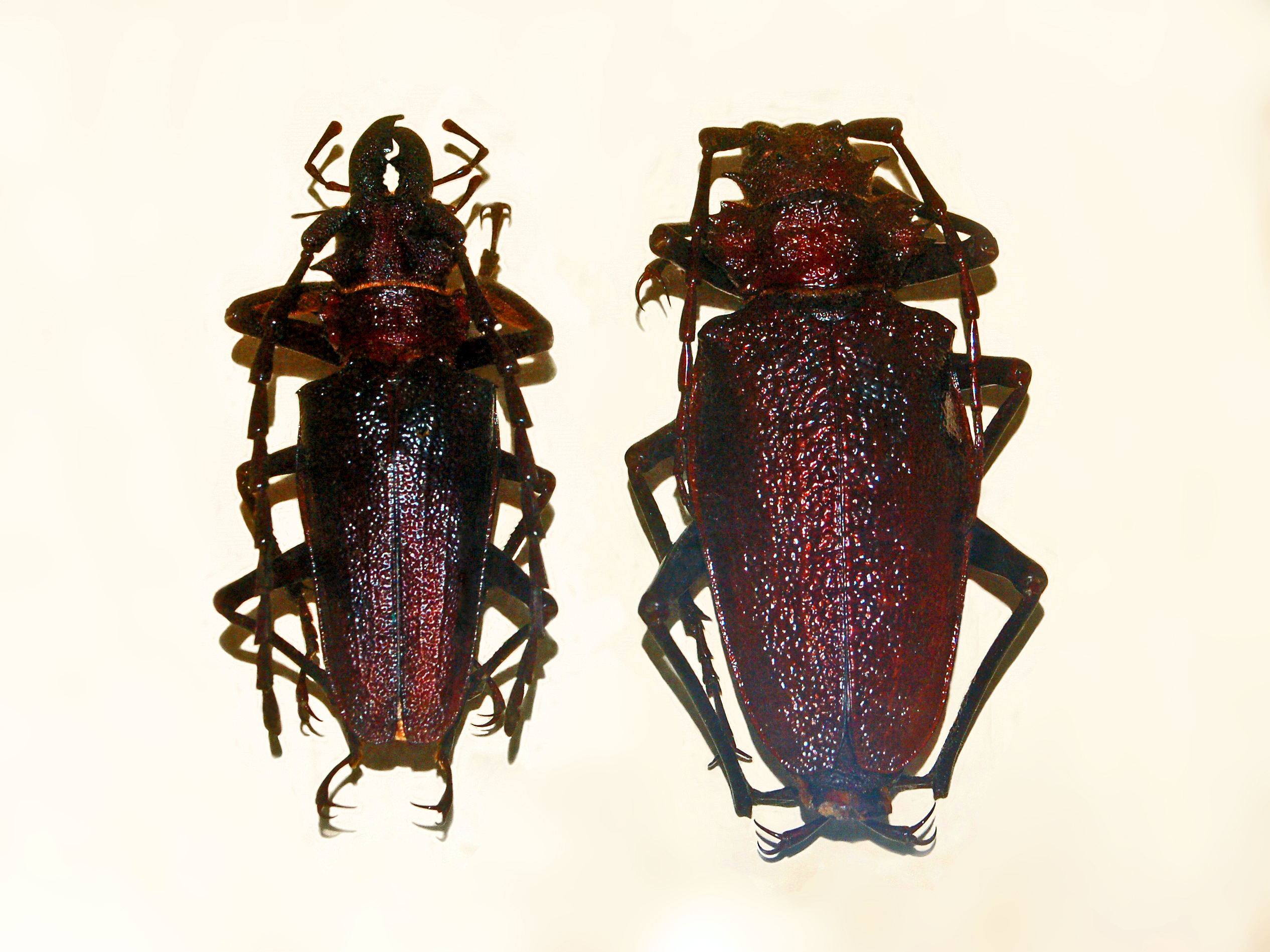
- Psalidognathus modestus from Colombia. Male and female

Scientific classification
- Domain: Eukaryota
- Kingdom: Animalia
- Phylum: Arthropoda
- Class: Insecta
- Order: Coleoptera
- Suborder: Polyphaga
- Infraorder: Cucujiformia
- Family: Cerambycidae
- Genus: Psalidognathus
- Species: P. modestus

Binomial name
- Psalidognathus modestus Fries, 1833

Synonyms
- Psalidognathus (prionacalus) modestus; Psalidognathus (psalidognathus) modestus; Psalidognathus (psalidognathus) thomsoni; Psalidognathus batesi; Psalidognathus batesii; Psalidognathus castaneipennis; Psalidognathus limbatus; Psalidognathus modestus; Psalidognathus mygaloides; Psalidognathus thomsoni; Psalidognathus wallisi; Psalidognathus wallisii

= Psalidognathus modestus =

Species of beetle

Psalidognathus modestus is a species of beetle belonging to the family Cerambycidae.

== Description ==
Psalidognathus modestus can reach a length of 40–87 millimetres (1.6–3.4 in). The surface is shining and the basic colour is black or dark brown. The head is spiny and the mandibles are very large.

== Distribution ==
This species can be found in Colombia, Costa Rica, Ecuador, Panama and Venezuela.
