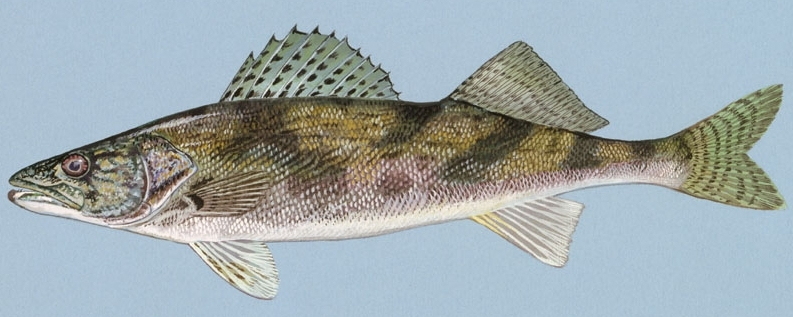

Conservation status
- Least Concern (IUCN 3.1)

- Secure (NatureServe)

Scientific classification
- Kingdom: Animalia
- Phylum: Chordata
- Class: Actinopterygii
- Division: Teleostei
- Order: Perciformes
- Family: Percidae
- Subfamily: Luciopercinae
- Genus: Sander
- Species: S. canadensis

Binomial name
- Sander canadensis (Griffith & Smith, 1834)

Synonyms
- Lucioperca canadensis Griffith & Smith, 1834; Stizostedion canadense (Griffith & Smith, 1834)

= Sauger =

Species of fish

The sauger (Sander canadensis) is a freshwater perciform fish of the family Percidae that resembles its close relative, the walleye (Sander vitreus). The species is a member of the largest vertebrate order, the Perciformes. It is the most migratory percid species in North America.

Saugers have two dorsal fins; the first is spiny and the posterior is soft-rayed. Their paired fins are in the thoracic position and their caudal fin is truncated, or squared off at the corners, a characteristic of the family Percidae. Another physical characteristic of saugers is their ctenoid scales, which are common in advanced fishes. Saugers have a fusiform body structure, and as a result are well adapted predatory fishes capable of swimming into fast currents with minimal drag on their bodies. They may be distinguished from walleyes by the distinctly spotted first dorsal fin, by the lack of a white splotch on the caudal fin, by the rough skin over their gills, and by their generally more brassy color, or darker (almost black) color in some regions. The typical sauger is 300 to 400 g (11 to 14 oz) in weight.

== Distribution ==
Saugers are widely distributed; their historical range consisted of the eastern U.S. west of the Appalachian Mountains, mostly southern, central, and western U.S., and north into southern Canada. Sauger distribution and range has decreased from historical ranges because of degraded and fragmented habitat conditions. Sauger distribution within their home range varies by time of year because they are migratory. Saugers are more typical in rivers, whereas walleyes are more common in lakes and reservoirs. In many parts of their range, saugers are sympatric with walleyes. Hybridization between saugers and walleyes is not unknown; the hybrids, referred to as saugeyes, exhibit traits of both species. Being intermediate in appearance between the two species, saugeyes are sometimes difficult to differentiate, but they generally carry the dark blotches characteristic of the sauger. Saugers, however, are usually smaller and better tolerate waters of higher turbidity than walleyes. Saugers require warmer summer water temperatures of 20–28 °C (68–82 °F). Their need for warm water is thought to affect the northern and western boundaries of their range.

== Reproduction and lifecycle ==
Saugers generally move upstream to spawn during March to May, depending on where they are. They move downstream to their home locations from April–July after their spawning period is over. Saugers have been known to travel between 10 and 600 km from their home to spawning locations upstream. Habitats at spawning sites are less complex and diverse than home locations. Females prefer rocky substrate and pools to deposit their eggs. As females increase in length, egg quality and fecundity increase, but egg production is thought to decline after age 6. Sexual maturity is reached between 2 and 5 years old. Other measures of sexual maturity are related to size. A sauger is considered to be an adult when it reaches 250 to 300 millimetres (9.8 to 11.8 in). Upon hatching, larval saugers drift downstream before developing feeding tendencies and horizontal maneuverability. Juvenile saugers tend to develop in diversion canals and backwaters until autumn, when they migrate into river channel winter habitat. Entrainment in diversion canals is a large cause of mortality for juvenile saugers.

== Diet ==
Saugers feed on a variety of invertebrates and small fishes depending on the time of year and size of the sauger. Channel catfish Ictalurus punctatus and freshwater drum Aplodinotus grunniens are midsize (300–379 mm) and large (>379 mm) saugers' main food source during spring. The diet of a small sauger (200–299 mm) is slightly different from a larger sauger's. Smaller saugers generally feed on benthic invertebrates, mayfly naiads, and catfish during spring and summer. Midsized and large saugers feed mainly on fish from spring to autumn, but their diets alter during summer. Midsized and large saugers feed predominantly on mayfly naiads but only during summer. Freshwater drum Aplodinotus grunniens and gizzard shad Dorosoma cepedianum are predominant food sources for saugers of all sizes during autumn. Fish accounted for over 99% of a sauger's diet during autumn. Saugers also prey on shiners during spring and summer, but they do not account for a significant part of their diet. Shiners are absent from a sauger's diet in autumn probably due to their availability. Shiner species predated include emerald shiner (Notropis atherinoides).

== Habitat ==
Saugers are more likely to be found in large rivers with deep pools (depths greater than 0.6 m). They encounter a variety of habitats because of their migratory tendencies. They are usually found in natural rivers because they have more abundant pools and their flows have not been altered by dams or diversions. They are still common in impounded river systems. Diversions and dams affect habitat and spawning areas of saugers. They are usually found in areas with high turbidity, low channel slope, low stream velocity, and deep water. Saugers tend to select pools with sand and silt substrates, and habitat features that provide cover from the river current. They tend to avoid runs and riffles. They are most commonly found in pools that are at least 1.5 m deep. They can also be found in shallower pools, but in lesser numbers. No differences in habitat preference between males and females has been observed. The number of saugers observed increases with mean summer water temperature, maximum water depth, and alkalinity.

== Taxonomy ==
Alongside the walleye, the sauger forms the North American clade within the genus Sander, and the sauger is thought to have first speciated into its modern form about 7.3 million years ago. The sauger was first formally described as Lucioperca canadensis in 1834 by British naturalists and explorers Edward Griffith (1790–1858) and Charles Hamilton Smith (1776–1859) based on the work of French naturalist and anatomist Georges Cuvier (1769–1832) which Griffith translated from the French language.

== Conservation ==
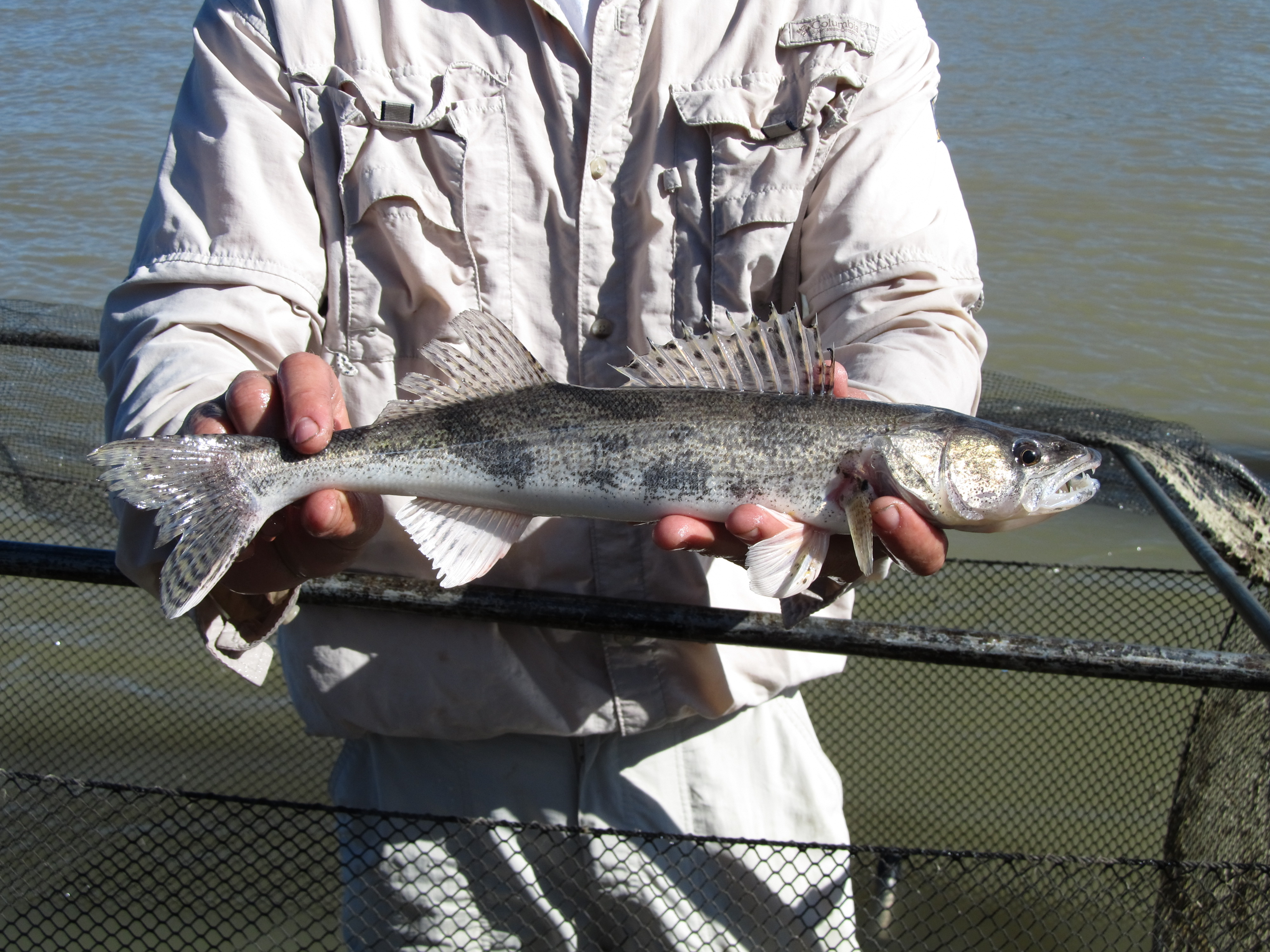
A sauger caught in the Yellowstone River

Saugers face many conservation issues because of migratory barriers, habitat loss, entrainment in irrigation canals, and overexploitation. Dams and diversion canals prevent spawning in upstream habitats. Altering flows in rivers affect turbidity, formation of pools, and temperature, all of which are important for the timing and success of spawning saugers. Long migrations are the main reason why saugers struggle in dammed or diverted river systems. Low water levels in periods of drought are the most detrimental to sauger populations because it strands eggs during spawning and prevents larval saugers from reaching their downstream locations. High death rates that occur during spawning are related to degraded and fragmented river systems. Mortality rates in autumn are related to exploitation by fishermen.

Sauger are critically imperiled in the state of New York, with a small population still remaining in Lake Champlain. Sauger were extirpated from Lake Erie at some point after a population crash in the 1950s, as well as from Lake Ontario. Populations in the Allegheny River are prevented from reaching New York by the Kinzua Dam, which has led to the initiation of a sauger stocking program in the upper Allegheny River. As of 2022, fishing for sauger in New York is totally prohibited statewide.
