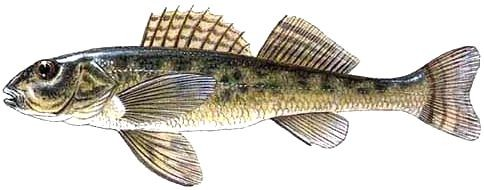

Conservation status
- Critically Endangered (IUCN 3.1)

Scientific classification
- Kingdom: Animalia
- Phylum: Chordata
- Class: Actinopterygii
- Order: Perciformes
- Family: Percidae
- Subfamily: Luciopercinae
- Tribe: Romanichthyini
- Genus: Romanichthys; M. Dumitrescu, Bănărescu & N. Stoica, 1957
- Species: R. valsanicola

Binomial name
- Romanichthys valsanicola M. Dumitrescu, Bănărescu & N. Stoica, 1957

= Romanichthys =

Genus of fishes

Romanichthys is a genus of ray-finned fish. It is one of two genera in the tribe Romanichthyini which, along with the tribe Luciopercini, forms the subfamily Luciopercinae of the family Percidae. This happens alongside the perches, ruffes, and darters. The genus contains the single species Romanichthys valsanicola, known as the sculpin-perch, asprete, or Romanian darter.

This fish was described in 1957 by Romanian student scientists M. Dumitrescu, P. Bănărescu, and N. Stoica. Local names include asprete, poprete, and sforete. Endemic to a very restricted area in southern Romania, it was found in the upper reach of the Argeş River and in two of its tributaries: Râul Doamnei and Vâlsan. Due to hydrotechnical constructions and deterioration of its habitat, it survived only in the tributary Vâlsan.

== Description ==
R. valsanicola is a small, greyish-brown fish growing to about 10–12 cm (4–4.5 in) long, covered with small, rough scales. It can be distinguished from other European perches by the two clearly separated dorsal fins. The first has eight or nine spines and the anal fin has 7½ branched rays and 58–68 scales along the lateral line. The fish is considered to be a living fossil, unchanged for tens of millions of years.

== Biology ==
The time of reproduction is in May and June. The female lays 120 to 150 eggs under rocks. This fish is active at night and feeds on the aquatic larvae of insects such as stoneflies (Plecoptera), caddisflies (Trichoptera), and mayflies (Ephemeroptera). It hides under stones during the day. It is a nocturnal species that is highly territorial, and the territories are aggressively defended at night.

== Status ==
This species is an endangered freshwater fish and is found on the red list of the IUCN, where it is rated as Critically Endangered. Its area of distribution has drastically diminished, and it is now considered to be the European fish genus with the most restricted range. The last remaining population in the Vâlsan River is totally reliant on the amount of water released by the reservoir immediately upstream. A Romanian NGO, the Bucharest Institute of Biology, has worked to preserve this species with the financial support of the Regional Environmental Center. Official estimates assert that no more than 15 specimens are living in a 1 km^{2} (0.39 sq mi) area of the Vâlsan; observations as of October 2022 have confirmed 58 individuals.

== Taxonomy ==
Romanichthys is the sister taxon of the four species in the genus Zingel and some evidence suggests that these two genera may be a single genus and that the asprete should be classified within Zingel.
