= Fish stocking =

Releasing Fish from hatchery

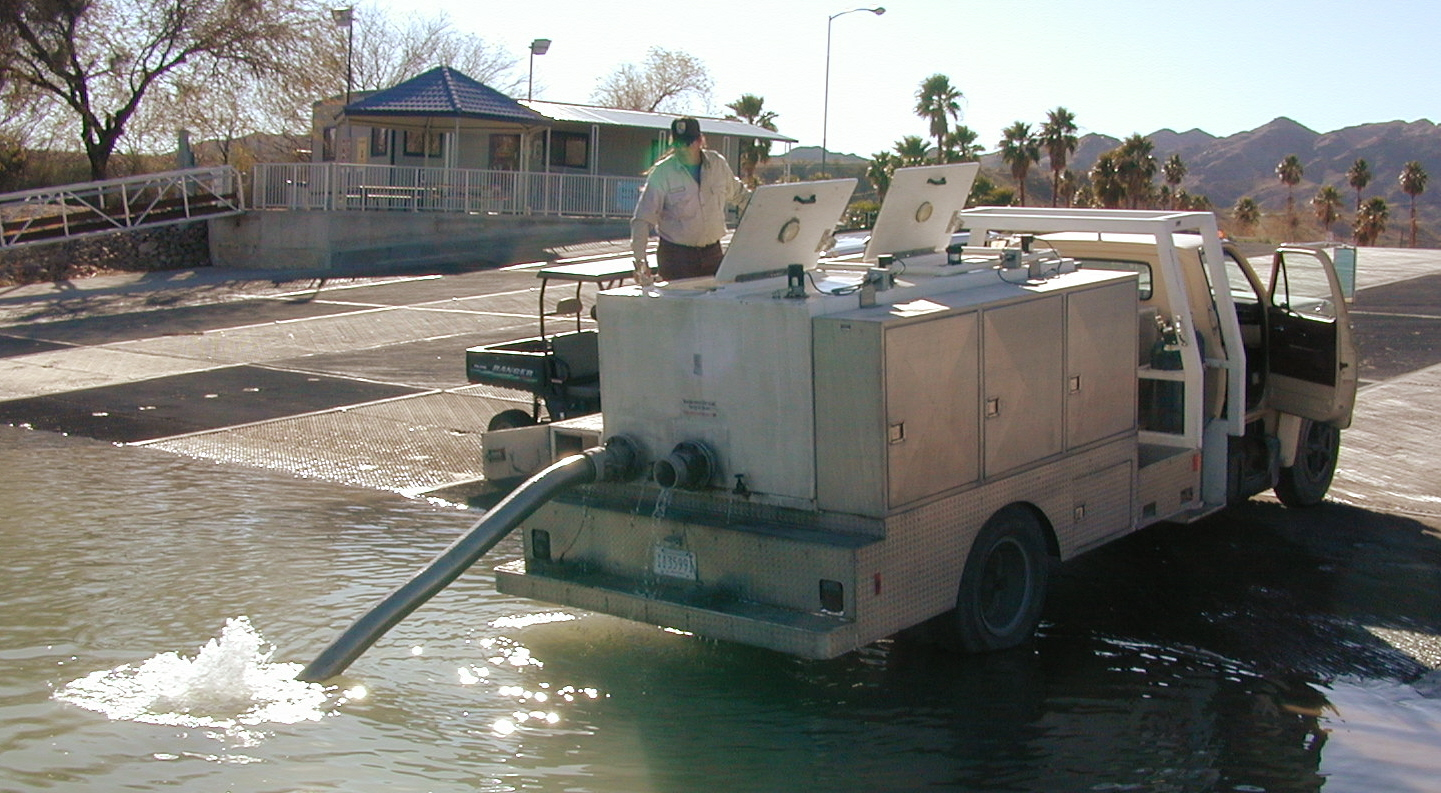
Stocking fish in a river in California

Fish stocking is the practice of releasing fish that are artificially raised in a hatchery into a natural body of water (river, lake, or ocean), to supplement existing wild populations or to create a new population where previously none exists. Stocking may be done for the benefit of commercial, recreational or tribal heritage fishing, but may also be done for ecological conservation to restore or increase the population of threatened/endangered fish species that is pressured by prior overfishing, habitat destruction, and/or competition from invasive species.

Fish stocking may be conducted by governmental fisheries management agencies, non-profit organizations, and voluntary associations in public waters, or by for-profit NGOs, clubs and commercial enterprises in privately owned waters. When in public waters, fish stocking creates a common-pool resource which is rivalrous in nature but non-excludable. Thus, on public grounds, all can enjoy the benefits of fishing so long as fish continue to be stocked.

== History ==
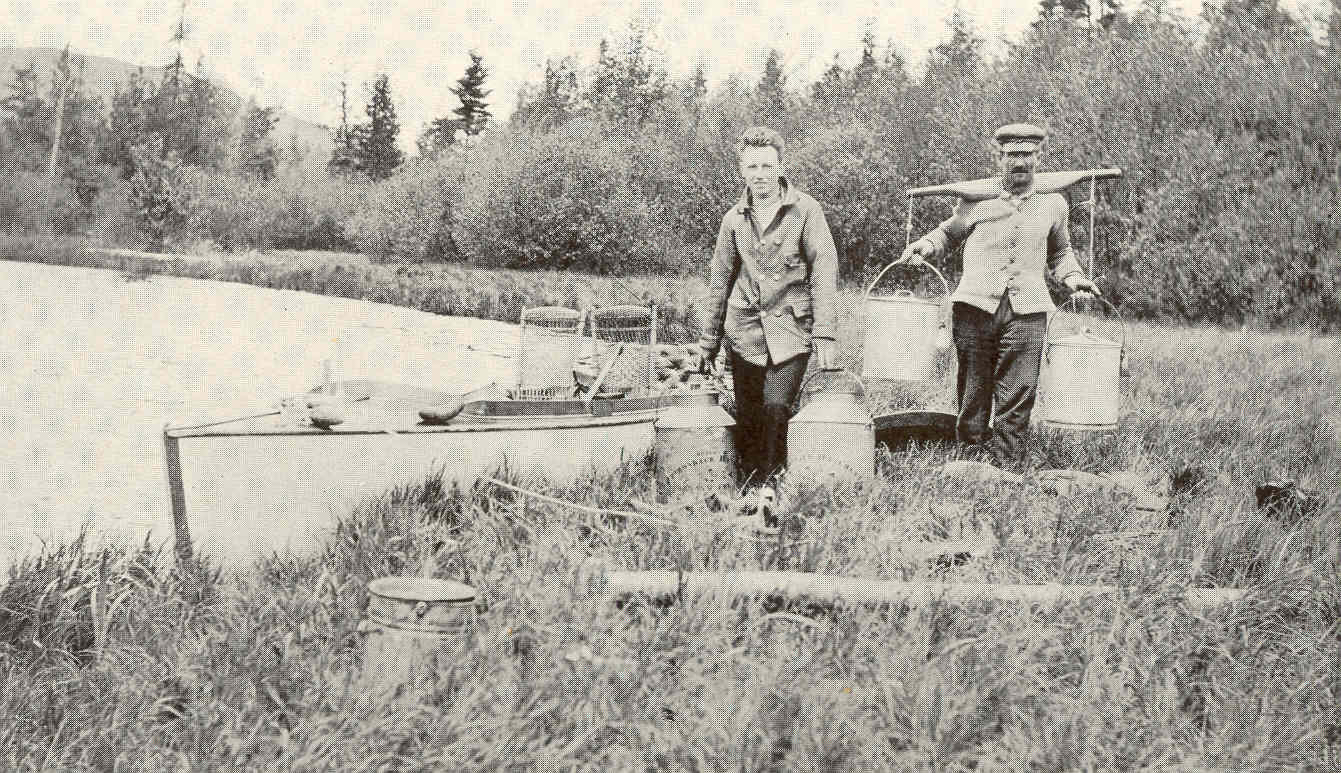
Fishery workers stocking a brook near Saranac Lake, New York, 1911

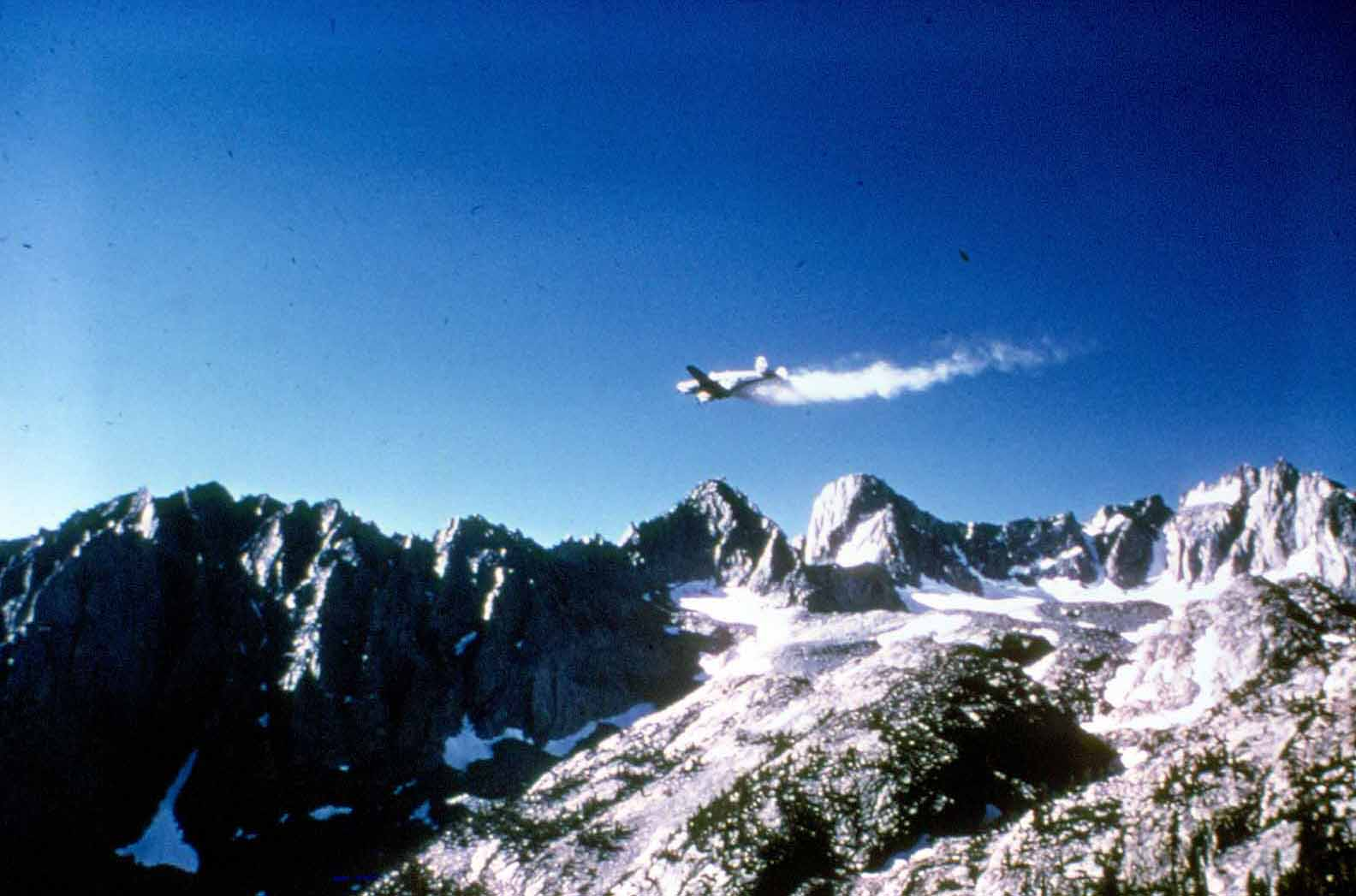
A CDFG aircraft performing aerial fish stocking, 1977

Fish stocking is a practice that dates back hundreds of years. According to biologist Edwin Pister, widespread trout stocking in the United States dates back to the 1800s. For the first hundred years of stocking, the location and number of fish introduced was not well recorded; the singular goal of stocking was to enhance sport fishing regardless of ecological ramifications such as erosion of biodiversity. As Pister states, "When trout planting was first implemented, the nation was gripped with a highly utilitarian resource management ethic that placed short-term human interests above virtually any other consideration". Recently, the U.S. Fish and Wildlife Service along with state fishery branches have done a better job of recording exactly what species of fish are stocked at any given location. This began in the 1960s when research suggested the negative impacts of fish stocking on the ecological complexity of other life forms. The Wilderness Act of 1964 also opened the public's eyes to the impact stocking has on other organisms. Thus, fish stocking is now the subject of much debate as there are various costs and benefits associated with the practice.

In the United States, stocking non-native fish for sport and food was just beginning in 1871 when the US Fish Commission was established. The head of the new agency, Spencer Fullerton Baird, was tasked to research "the decrease of the food fishes of the seacoasts and the lakes of the United States and to suggest remedial measures". Baird made his headquarters at Woods Hole on Cape Cod, Massachusetts. There, his team of scientists and researchers conducted studies on striped bass, blue fish and many other commercial and sport fish. They compiled their research into a 255-page report on United States fish resources. Congress granted the team $15,000 to develop food fish stocks, and non-native fish such as rainbow trout, salmon, striped bass and carp were subsequently introduced successfully into United States lakes and rivers. In the early years, fish were stocked by sports clubs and private citizens. Today, state fish and wildlife agencies along with hatcheries are responsible for distributing fish. And until recently, their goal was to plant as many fish as possible into as many bodies of water as possible. Now, with knowledge of the detrimental effects fish stocking has on invertebrate and amphibian populations, it is conducted much more selectively.

== Stocking today ==
Today, much more thought is put into introducing non-native species as they can severely damage the populations of fragile natives; practices lean more towards sustainability. Stocking is used to restore native species to waters where they have been overfished or can no longer breed. "Give and take" stocking practices are those where fish are stocked only to be fished and then restocked. In response, most states have adopted regulations that prohibit fish stocking in areas that may damage aquatic life or ecosystem diversity, and encourage stocking in bodies of water where no harm will result from doing so. Trout Unlimited has a policy, for example, that states "where a body of scientific evidence shows that stocking in historically non-salmonid waters adversely affects native biodiversity, such stocking should cease." While many organizations remain focused solely on providing quality fishing opportunities, policies and attitudes are shifting toward resource integrity and protection.

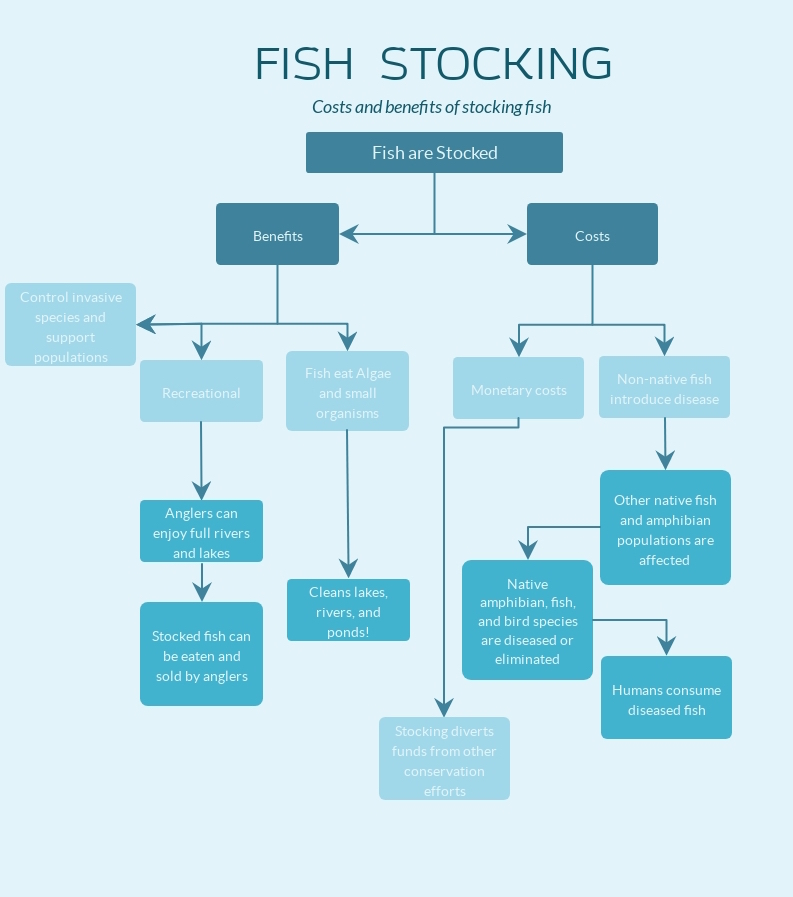
Costs and benefits of fish stocking

In Pennsylvania alone, the PA Fish & Boat Commission is scheduled to stock 4,398,227 trout (brook, brown, and rainbows) into its streams and lakes in 2019. Also in 2019, Lake Ontario, one of the five Great Lakes, is projected to receive 2,767,660 stocked salmon and trout. According to data by state agencies, in 2004 roughly 1.7 billion fish were stocked across the United States. With 104 different species of fish stocked, a total of 43.65 million pounds of fish were released, primarily in the Western states. In the US, common species that are currently stocked for sport include trout, bass, salmon, muskellunge, walleye, and several species of panfish.

Before being released into rivers, lakes, ponds, and occasionally oceans across the country, fish are raised in a fish hatchery. When the supply is running low in a given body of water, fish are transported from hatcheries in a large water tank or airplane to their respective locations. The costs associated with stocking are typically covered by angler associations, commercial fishermen, state fish and game agencies, and at times government subsidies; today, most stocking is conducted by state fish and game departments.

Radinger et al., 2023 conducted large-scale experiments across 20 lakes, to systematically test the effects of stocking fish compared to habitat-based interventions (i.e. creating shallow zones and adding coarse woody habitats). Over a period of six years, they closely monitored the fish population response in each lake. The study revealed that species-focused fish stocking was completely unsuccessful and demonstrated the potential for ecosystem-based management to better meet conservation goals.

== Benefits of stocking ==
Stocking can help restore threatened, endangered, or native fish species. The Union for Conservation of Nature's red list of endangered species has 1,414 species of fish that are at risk of extinction. Stocking them into lakes, rivers, and streams can support existing populations that are threatened and reduce the number of endangered or extirpated species. Many of the fish commonly used for stocking also have low reproductive rates and tend to be overfished if not stocked annually. Moreover, as stocked fish tend to contain larger trophy fish, many anglers are more willing to pay for a fishing license, meaning state fishing departments have more revenue to spend on natural resource management and conservation efforts. In 2018, there were roughly 30 million paid license holders in the US, grossing $720 million that year.

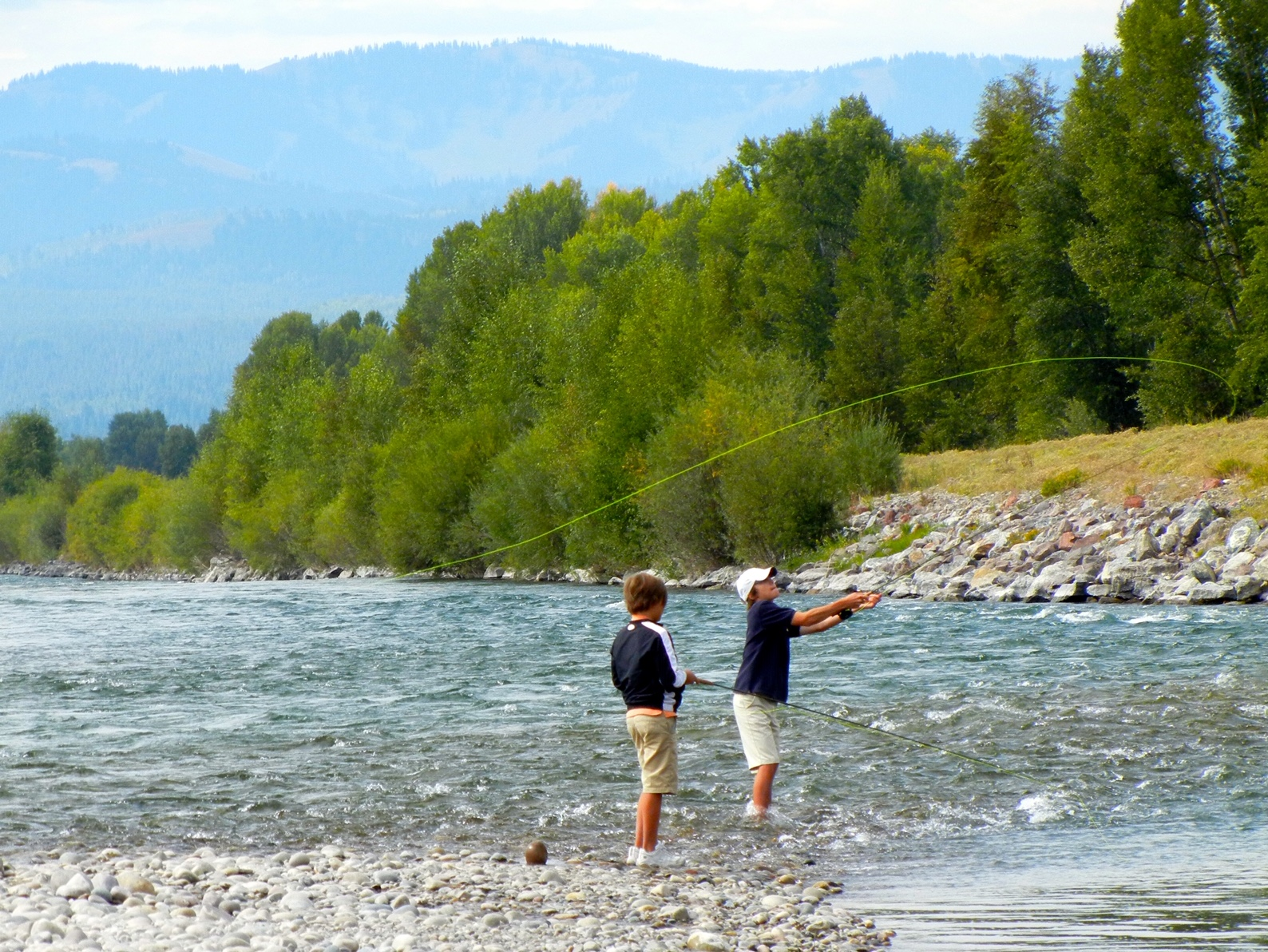
Fishing for stocked trout in Wyoming

Many species of fish including grass carp and the suckermouth catfish help clean bodies of water by eating algae and other green organisms. Algae can take over stagnant ponds, attracting insects and making lakes, rivers, and ponds unpleasant to look at. To treat them, many individuals will choose to stock certain species of fish. This creates a positive externality for those who enjoy a variety of water activities. Studies have also examined the economic viability of fish stocking. Hansson, Arrheniusm, and Nellbring of Stockholm University find that simple economic analysis suggests Volga pikeperch stocking can be profitable; based on the capital invested in the stock, the economic yield results in an annual interest rate of 43% (from the viewpoint of anglers). These authors also find that increased populations of stocked fish decreases manpower and equipment costs associated with each catch. They also find that specifically for pikeperch, stocking can restore food web interactions to a more "natural" level where herring populations are reduced and zooplankton flourish, thus benefiting the ecosystem as a whole.

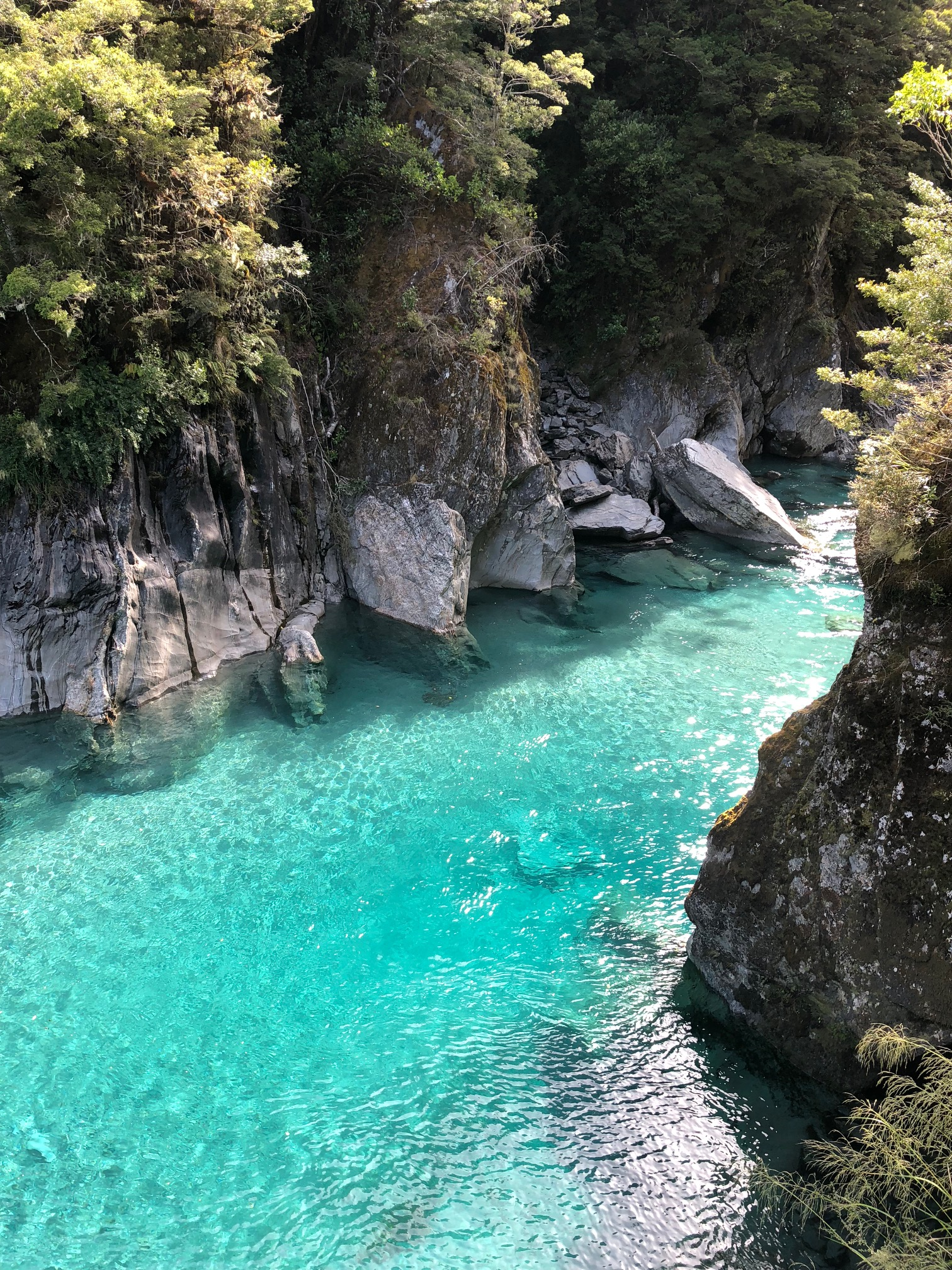
Fish are stocked all over the world. This river in Mount Aspiring National Park, New Zealand, is stocked with trout.

There are additional benefits to fish stocking. Anglers across the country spend millions of dollars through license fees (which benefit state governments) and fishing equipment such as rods, reels, and lures. Members of fishing societies such as the International Game Fish Association and the Bass Anglers Sportsman Society also enjoy fishing in more robust bodies of water. Despite the findings mentioned above, Virginia researchers have found that even with stockings of rainbow trout, 80% of fish in its stocked streams are still natives. The Department of Natural Resources in Minnesota also found that stocked muskie can coexist because biologically-based guidelines are used when choosing what and where to stock.

== Drawbacks and risks ==
Some groups, including the Pacific Rivers Council, believe that stocking diverts money away from more effective conservation and protection efforts. In addition, declining populations of native golden trout, a now-threatened species, has been linked to stocking of non-native species. As a matter of fact, 35 species of fish and amphibians have been negatively affected by stocking practices in California. Scientists have established a direct link between non-native fish stocking and decline of these species: golden trout, Lahontan cutthroat trout, mountain yellow-legged frog, Yosemite toad and Cascades frog are all threatened by the stocking practice. Mating between native and introduced fish species can lower the fitness of natural populations, thereby introducing diseases that affect fish and other wildlife. In fact, a study conducted in Virginian streams found that an infectious virus was found only in brook trout populations that had a history of stocking. These diseases may affect humans who consume them as well. Maintaining a balanced ecosystem with biological diversity is also extremely important.

Many scientists have claimed that because fish that are stocked tend to be apex predators, native species may become prey and have to compete with the oftentimes larger introduced fish for food and habitats. Additionally, the use of aircraft to stock fish in the second half of the 20th century meant pilots often stocked the wrong lakes or rivers. In many cases, this had disastrous consequences. When fish, specifically trout, are stocked into ecologically sensitive bodies of water, invertebrate populations and amphibians are threatened, altering the natural selection pressures within the ecosystem. Stocked rainbow trout have been outcompeting native brook trout in many southeastern United States bodies of water, for example. Even bird populations such as cormorants are affected. According to findings by the Ecological Society of America, when gulls in the Great Lakes area were examined after fish stocking, they consumed more garbage, presumably due to the decrease in native prey fish by the predatory stocked fish. Another study found that stocked fish in the Pacific Northwest spread a disease that caused a 15% increase in amphibian embryo mortality. In 2005, the Center for Biological Diversity studied bodies of water across California and found that non-native trout had been stocked in at least 47 areas where rare species were present, damaging 39 imperiled fish and amphibians. Members of the Wilderness Research Institute claim that fish stocking compromises the "naturalness" of aquatic ecosystems and that protecting water quality is more important than recreational opportunities.

== How to stock a private pond ==
When stocking a private pond, it is important to introduce three prey fish for every predator fish. This ensures that predatory fish have enough nutrition to survive and that prey fish can still reproduce. It is also recommended to stock fathead minnows so that both predator and prey fish have enough to feed on. Introducing fish of similar sizes is another important step to ensure that the population grows together. At the same time, make sure that the existing fish in the pond are not significantly larger than the ones being added. For a standard one-quarter acre pond, it is recommended to stock 120 sunfish, 60 yellow perch, 15 largemouth bass, and 8 pounds of fathead minnows. One way to determine what kinds of fish are already living in a given body of water is to monitor local streams, rivers, and lakes and record what species of fish are being caught.

The best time to stock is in the spring or fall due to mild temperatures and higher levels of oxygen in the water. To acclimate the fish, place the transportation bag in a shaded part of the water and leave it floating for 15–20 minutes. Before releasing the fish, make sure that larger fish and smaller fish are released at different ends of the pond, giving the prey an opportunity to find shelter. Studies show that releasing small numbers of fish at regular intervals is more effective than releasing all at once, so if possible, plan to release them over a few weeks.

It is also important to stock the correct species of fish. For warm water ponds, it is recommended to stock largemouth bass, bluegill, crappie, channel catfish, and bullheads. For larger and deeper lakes, stocking cool water game fish such as walleye and trout species is recommended. Lastly, it is important to make sure that no pond or body of water is overstocked. Each has a carrying capacity, meaning that any given body of water can only sustain a certain amount of fish. If this carrying capacity is exceeded, fish will have to compete for food and cover, resulting in damage to all organisms in the water.

== Legislation ==
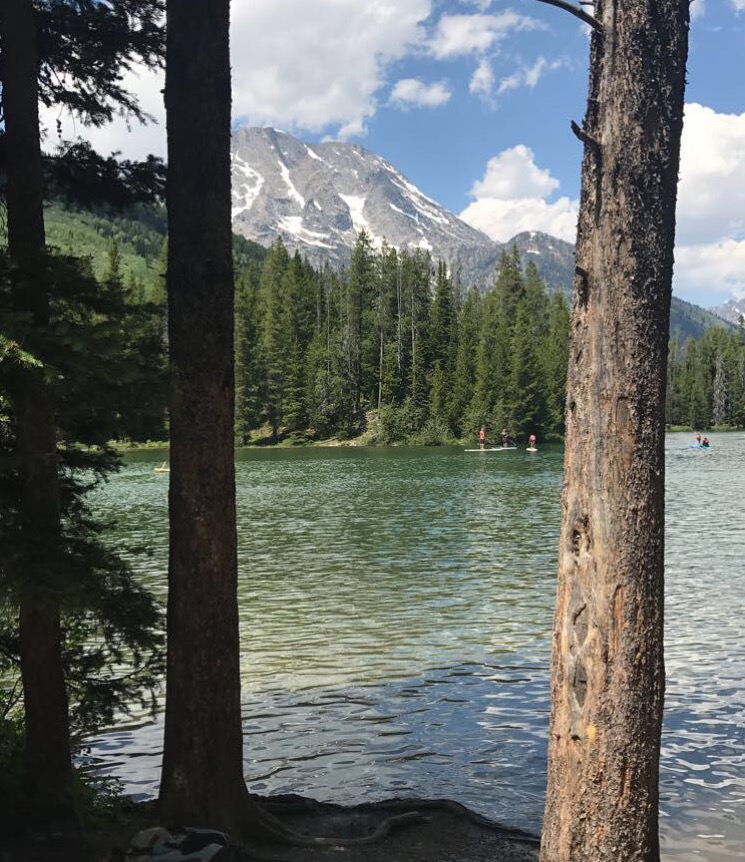
Yellowstone has adopted a "catch-and-release" policy for fishermen

Different countries and states have their own regulations regarding fish stocking. These regulations also differ depending on if it is a government office or private individual conducting the stocking. In the past century, many areas have banned fish stocking for a variety of reasons. In 1959, for example, Yellowstone National Park fish stocking was banned due to cross-breeding between native and nonnative species that was harming the genetic uniqueness of existing populations. This makes fish populations more susceptible to disease. Today, Yellowstone has adopted the "catch-and-release method" to ensure that fishermen release fish back into the water after catching them. There are also restrictions on what types of lures can be used; for example, some sections of the park are open to fly fishing only, a much safer form of fishing that does not damage aquatic life. There is a Native Trout Conservation Area where regulations are structured so that fishermen can selectively remove nonnative fish from the water without damaging native fishery.

In 2005, California's Center for Biological Diversity submitted a petition to the Department of Fish and Game requesting that the state initiate a review of its fish stocking practices. The reform campaign aimed to protect existing habitats and native populations of fish and amphibians. Finally, in 2008, the Sacramento Superior Court ordered the state to consult with various groups in finding ways to protect native species from fish stocking practices. Initially, the California Department of Fish and Game agreed to eliminate the environmental harm of its stocking practices, but when it filed its impact report in 2011, protection of native fish and amphibians was clearly not a priority. The agency was brought to court again but was promptly denied. With the state Commission denying the Department of Fish and Game's proposed changes for fish stocking, private hatcheries continue to stock state waters under the same permit regulations. The Department aimed to require that all hatcheries and fisheries pay for biological assessment before stocking, thus preventing many of its negative consequences. However, the state of California made it clear that it will not make fisheries go through the stringent permitting process. In February of 2015, the California Third District of Appeals struck down the Department of Fish and Wildlife's permitting requirement on recreational fishing, which would have essentially driven fish farms and hatcheries out of business. This ruling ensures fishermen in California will have the opportunity to fish in stocked lakes and ponds in the future.

Each state has its own regulations regarding fish stocking. Though some state stocking programs restore native populations, others compromise the ecological values of the wilderness areas. The Bureau of Land Management regulates that fishless waters may only be stocked after considering the scientific value of the waters on a case-by-case basis. Fish stocking, however, is not entirely monitored by the Federal government; most current federal regulations hand authority for fish stocking to the states, except on federal lands or when "direct involvement of federal wilderness" managers is necessary for decision making. Historically, there has been a jurisdictional debate between state and federal agencies, with states arguing that fish stocking is a prerogative supported by the 10th Amendment to the Constitution. Interestingly, the roots of wildlife ownership are grounded in feudal Europe where fish were considered to be common property to all citizens, subject to government control. However, this control over wildlife was transferred to the states with the separation of the Colonies from Britain. Despite the federal government's right to exercise wildlife authority, current regulation states that "Congress has, in fact, reaffirmed the basic responsibility and authority of the States to manage fish and resident wildlife." In the future, if more differences in opinion between state and federal managers arise, there may be a need for increased cooperation and coordination between state and federal wilderness managers. Colorado, for example, has regulations to control the stocking of nonnative fish, but only below 6,500 feet. To find out more about each state's fish stocking regulations, visit their respective Department of Fish and Wildlife websites. Today, the International Association of Fish and Wildlife Agencies (IAFWA), a series of policies for fish management, is used between state and federal agencies to provide a framework for cooperation and coordination related to fish stocking in America.

== See also ==
- List of harvested aquatic animals by weight
- Freshwater fish
- Fish hatchery
- Fishing
