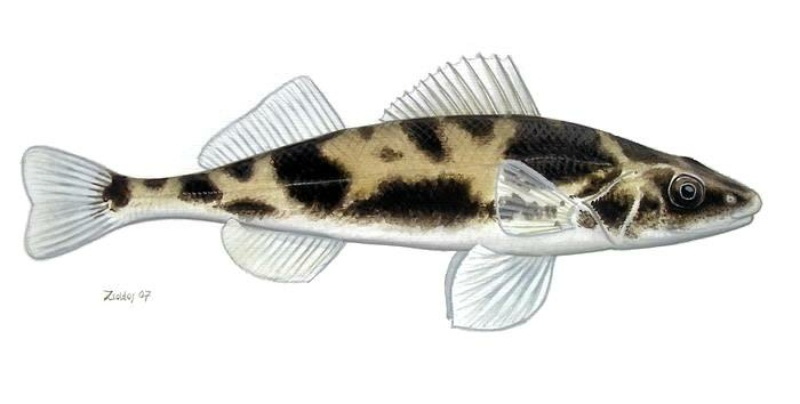

Conservation status
- Least Concern (IUCN 3.1)

Scientific classification
- Kingdom: Animalia
- Phylum: Chordata
- Class: Actinopterygii
- Division: Teleostei
- Order: Perciformes
- Family: Percidae
- Subfamily: Luciopercinae
- Genus: Zingel
- Species: Z. zingel

Binomial name
- Zingel zingel (Linnaeus, 1766)

Synonyms
- Aspro zingel (Linnaeus, 1758); Perca zingel Linnaeus, 1766

= Zingel zingel =

Species of fish

Zingel zingel, the zingel, is a species of freshwater ray-finned fish in the family Percidae. It is found in fast-flowing streams in southeastern Europe. It is the type species of the genus Zingel.

== Description ==
Zingel zingel has two separate dorsal fins with 13–15 spines in the first and 18–20 soft rays in the second. No scales occur on the cheeks. They grow to 15 to 30 cm (5.9 to 11.8 in) in length with a maximum length of 48 cm (19 in).

== Distribution ==
Zingel zingel is endemic to the drainage basins of the Danube and Dniestr in south-eastern Europe. They have been recorded from Austria, Bosnia and Herzegovina, Bulgaria, Croatia, Czechia, Germany, Hungary, Moldova, Montenegro, North Macedonia, Poland, Romania, Serbia, Slovakia, Slovenia, and Ukraine.

== Habitat and biology ==
Zingel zingel adults are found in fast-flowing waters in the main course of large rivers. They spawn over sandy bottoms during March and April. Each female mates with several males in dense spawning aggregations. Each female lays about 5,000 adhesive eggs that attach to gravel. Their prey is made up of aquatic insects, crustaceans, fish eggs, and smaller fish. They normally occur at lower altitudes than the streber (Z. streber).

== Taxonomy ==
Zingel zingel was first formally described as Perca zingel in 1766 by Linnaeus with the type locality given as the River Danube in Germany. When Hippolyte Cloquet (1787–1840) created the genus Zingel he made this species the type species by absolute tautonymy.
