= Floral Formation =

- Type: Formation

Location
- Region: Saskatchewan
- Country: Canada

The Floral Formation is a geologic formation in Saskatchewan. It preserves fossils.

== See also ==
- List of fossiliferous stratigraphic units in Saskatchewan
