= List of fossiliferous stratigraphic units in Saskatchewan =

This is a list of fossiliferous stratigraphic units in Saskatchewan, Canada.

Group or formation	Period	Notes
Ashville Formation	Cretaceous	
Bearpaw Formation	Cretaceous	
Bearpaw Shale Formation	Cretaceous	
Belly River Group/Dinosaur Park Formation	Cretaceous	
Colorado Group/Belle Fourche Formation	Cretaceous	
Colorado Group/Favel Formation	Cretaceous	
Colorado Group/Niobrara Formation	Cretaceous	
Cypress Hills Formation	Neogene, Paleogene	
Deadwood Formation	Cambrian	
Edmonton Group/Whitemud Formation	Cretaceous	
Floral Formation	Riddell	
Fort Union Formation	Paleogene	
Frenchman Formation	Paleogene, Cretaceous	
Judith River Formation	Cretaceous	
Lance Formation	Cretaceous	
Ravenscrag Formation	Paleogene, Cretaceous	
Stony Mountain Formation	Ordovician	
Wood Mountain Formation	Neogene	
