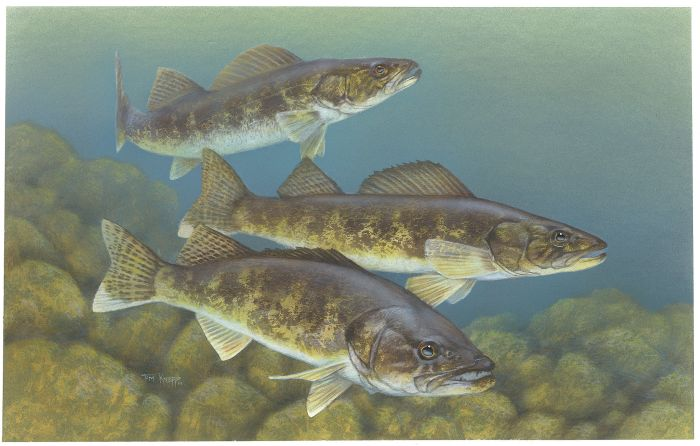
- Walleye (Sander vitreus)

Scientific classification
- Kingdom: Animalia
- Phylum: Chordata
- Class: Actinopterygii
- Division: Teleostei
- Order: Perciformes
- Family: Percidae
- Subfamily: Luciopercinae
- Tribe: Luciopercini; Jordan & Evermann, 1896
- Genus: Sander; Oken, 1817

Type species
- Perca lucioperca Linnaeus, 1758

Species
- 5, See text.

Synonyms
- Lucioperca Schinz, 1822; Perca (Lucioperca) Fleming, 1822; Perca (Sandat) Bory de Saint-Vincent, 1828; Perca (Stizostedion) Rafinesque, 1820; Sandat Cloquet, 1829; Sandrus Stark, 1828; Schilus Jarocki, 1822; Schilus Krynicki, 1832; Stizostedion Rafinesque, 1820; Stizostedion (Cynoperca) Gill & Jordan in Jordan, 1877; Stizostedion (Mimoperca) Gill & Jordan in Jordan, 1877

= Sander (fish) =

Sander Temporal range: Middle Miocene to recent

Genus of fishes

Sander (formerly known as Stizostedion) is a genus of predatory ray-finned fish in the family Percidae, which also includes the perches, ruffes, and darters. They are also known as "pike-perch" because of their resemblance to fish in the unrelated Esocidae (pike) family. They are the only genus in the monotypic tribe Luciopercini, which is one of two tribes in the subfamily Luciopercinae.

The earliest known fossils of this genus are partial jaw and vertebrae elements from the middle Miocene (Barstovian)-aged Wood Mountain Formation of Saskatchewan, Canada.

== Characteristics ==
Sander species have elongated and laterally compressed bodies and they range in total length from 45 cm (18 in) in the Volga pikeperch (S. volgensis) to 130 cm (51 in) in the zander (S. lucioperca). The species within the genus share canine-like teeth that are at their largest in the zander, and although they are not present in adult Volga pikeperches, they do possess them as juveniles. in addition, they have thin rows of teeth on their jaws, vomer, and palatines, the preopercle shows strong serrations along its edges, a continuous lateral line reaches all the way from the head to the caudal fin, and this is flanked by additional lateral lines, one each on the upper and lower lobes of the deeply forked caudal fin. Further features in common include the absence of genital papillae, seven or eight branchiostegal rays, 12–13 soft rays in the anal fin, and the eye has a reflective layer behind the retina, known as a tapetum lucidum, which is an adaptation for seeing in low-light conditions. The species in the genus Sander are largely piscivorous as adults.

== Species ==
The genus includes these species:

- Sander canadensis Griffith & Smith, 1834 (sauger)
- Sander lucioperca Linnaeus, 1758 (zander)
- Sander marinus G. Cuvier, 1828 (estuarine perch)
- Sander vitreus Mitchill, 1818 (walleye)
- Sander volgensis J. F. Gmelin, 1789 (Volga pikeperch)

The following fossil species are also known:

- Sander martinii (Rückert-Ülkümen, 1994) (=Lucioperca martinii Rückert-Ülkümen, 1994) - Middle Miocene of Turkey
- Sander svetovidovi Kovalchuk, 2015 - Late Miocene of Ukraine

== Phylogeny ==
Phylogenetic relationships of the species of genus Sander based on the concatenated data set of six gene regions and a Bayesian analysis. Romanichthys valsanicola is the nearest living relative of the genus Sander and is used as an outgroup to root the tree.

- - Romanichthys valsanicola (nearest relative)
  - Sander
    - - Sander canadensis
      - Sander vitreus
    - - Sander volgensis
      - - Sander lucioperca
        - Sander marinus

This is not universally accepted, though, and the asprete (Romanichthys valsanicola) has been more recently placed within the genus Zingel.

Two clades are within the genus, a Eurasian one and a North American one, which separated from a common ancestor around 20.8 million years ago (Mya) in the Miocene, when the North Atlantic Land Bridge connecting Europe to eastern North America subsided. The Eurasian clade then speciated from 13.8 Mya, while the two North American species speciated around 5.4 Mya.

The relatively old divergences given for North American and Eurasian Sander are supported by the discovery of a fossil Sander from the middle Miocene (16.3 to 13.6 mya)-aged Wood Mountain Formation of Canada. Prior to this discovery, it was suggested that Sander may have potentially been a much more recent immigrant to North America, potentially as young as the Pliocene or even Pleistocene. In Eurasia, fossils of the extant S. lucioperca and the extinct S. svetovidovi are known from the Late Miocene and early Pliocene of Ukraine. Fossils of an indeterminate Sander species are also known from the Middle Miocene of Ukraine. These fossils also suggest a coexistence between Sander and their close relative, the now-extinct Leobergia. It has been theorized that Sander was more tolerant than Leobergia to the global cooling that occurred during the Pliocene, leading to the extinction of the latter.
