= Wood Mountain Formation =

Geologic formation

- Stratigraphic range: Neogene
- Type: Formation

Location
- Region: Saskatchewan
- Country: Canada

The Wood Mountain Formation is a geologic formation in Saskatchewan. It preserves fossils dating back to the Neogene period.

== See also ==
- List of fossiliferous stratigraphic units in Saskatchewan
