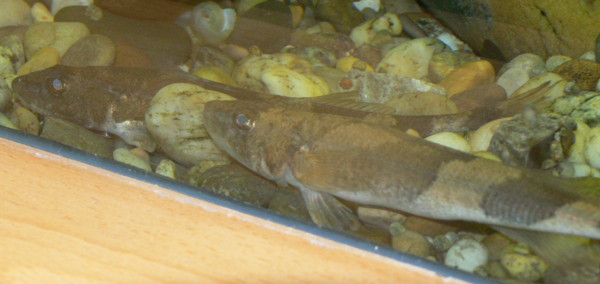
- Strebers (Zingel streber)

Scientific classification
- Kingdom: Animalia
- Phylum: Chordata
- Class: Actinopterygii
- Order: Perciformes
- Family: Percidae
- Subfamily: Luciopercinae
- Tribe: Romanichthyini
- Genus: Zingel; Cloquet, 1817

Type species
- Perca zingel Linnaeus, 1766

Species
- 4, see text

Synonyms
- Aspro Cuvier, 1828; Cingla Fleming, 1822

= Zingel =

Genus of fishes

Zingel is a genus of fish in the family Percidae. They are long and slender, reaching 12 to 48 cm (4.7 to 18.9 in) in length. They are found in rivers and streams in Europe. They feed mainly on aquatic invertebrates such as crustaceans and insect larvae, and also eat small fish. While they were all classed as endangered or vulnerable in the past, environmental improvements have allowed some to be reclassified to least concern.

== Species ==
The genus contains these species:

- Zingel asper (Linnaeus, 1758) (Rhone streber)
- Zingel balcanicus (S. L. Karaman, 1937) (Vardar streber)
- Zingel streber (Siebold, 1863) (Danube streber)
- Zingel zingel (Linnaeus, 1766) (Zingel)
