= Karl Theodor Ernst von Siebold =

German physiologist and zoologist (1804–1885)

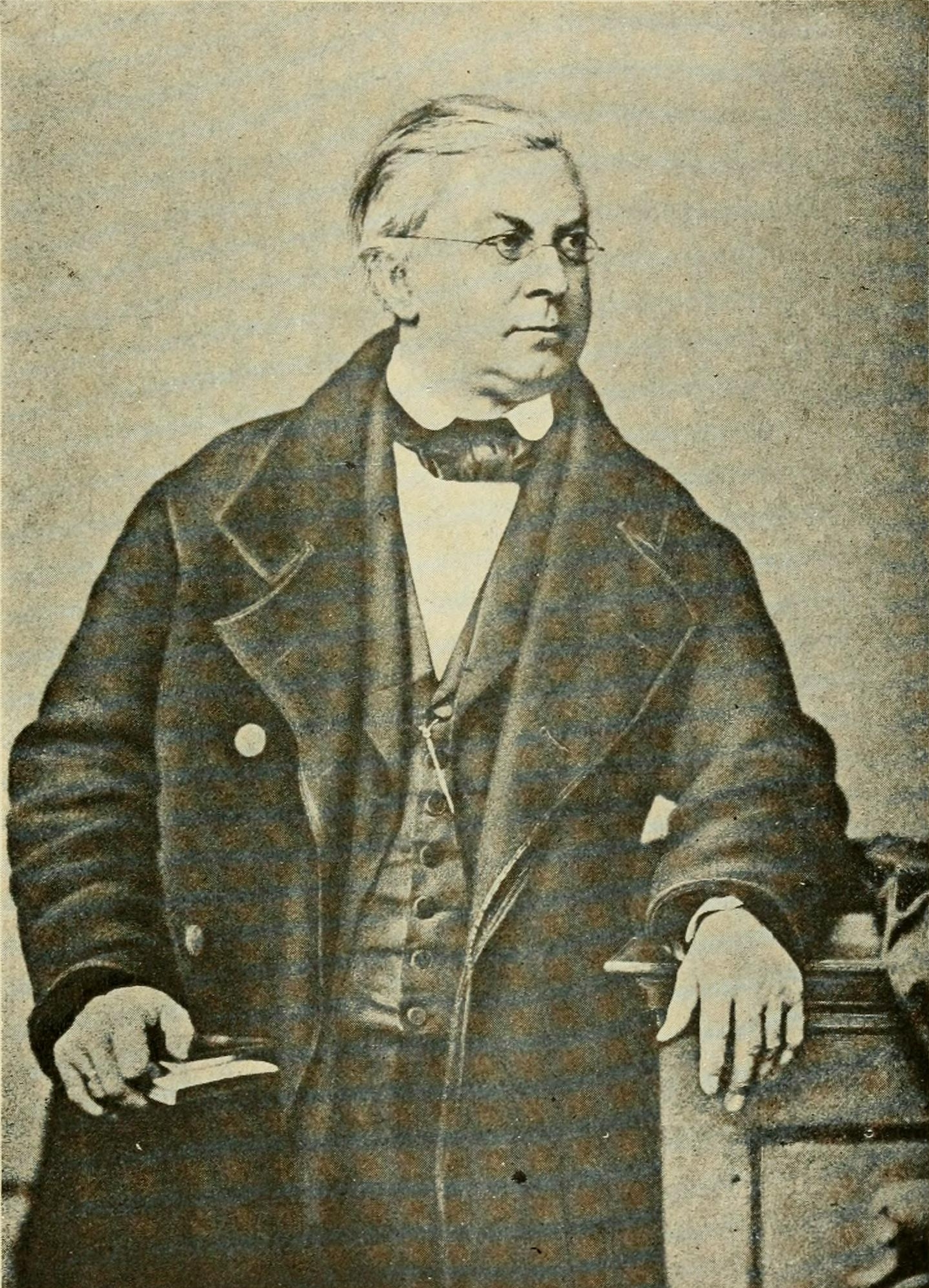
Karl Theodor Ernst von Siebold.

Prof Karl (Carl) Theodor Ernst von Siebold FRS(For) HFRSE (16 February 1804 – 7 April 1885) was a German physiologist and zoologist. He was responsible for the introduction of the taxa Arthropoda and Rhizopoda, and for defining the taxon Protozoa specifically for single-celled organisms.

== Biography ==
He was born at Würzburg in the Electorate of Bavaria, the son of Elias von Siebild (sic), a professor of obstetrics, and his wife, Sophie von Schaffer. He was educated in Würzburg and the Gymnasium zum Grauen Kloster in Berlin.

Von Siebold studied medicine and science chiefly at the University of Berlin (under Karl Rudolphi) and also at Göttingen (under Johann Friedrich Blumenbach), submitting a thesis on the metamorphosis of the salamander. In 1831 he began to practice medicine in Heilsberg, East Prussia (now Lidzbark Warmiński), moving in 1834 to Königsberg, and then in the same year to be Director of the Midwifery School in Danzig (now Gdańsk).

He became professor of zoology, comparative anatomy and veterinary science at Erlangen in 1840, professor of zoology and physiology at Freiburg im Breisgau in 1845, professor of physiology at Breslau (now Wrocław) in 1850, and professor of zoology and comparative anatomy at the LMU Munich in Munich in 1853. In Munich, he later received the additional duties as professor of zoology and director of the zoological and zootomical cabinet.

He was elected a member of the Royal Swedish Academy of Sciences in 1856. He was elected as a member to the American Philosophical Society in 1869.

He died in Munich on 7 April 1885, after a scientific career that led to many publications and resulted in a number of animal species named after him.

== Scientific work ==
His best-known publication was the Lehrbuch der Vergleichenden Anatomie (Manual of Comparative Anatomy) (1845–48) which he co-edited with Hermann Friedrich Stannius, being largely responsible for the first volume, on invertebrates (see Principal Publications). Siebold was the originator, after Cuvier, of the first important reforms in systematic zoology, and established the unicellular nature of the Protozoa, which he first combined into a phylum. He introduced the taxa Arthropoda and Rhizopoda. In 1848, together with R. A. von Kölliker he founded the leading biological journal Zeitschrift für Wissenschaftliche Zoologie (Journal for Scientific Zoology), which he edited until his death. This was long the leading morphological and anatomical journal of Europe.

His scientific accomplishments included (in 1851) collaborating with Theodor Bilharz on the first description of the blood-fluke Schistosoma haematobium, (in 1853) the elucidation of the life cycle of the tapeworm Echinococcus granulosus, (in 1854) the suggestion that the cercariae of the fluke Fasciola hepatica were the infective stage which passed from the invertebrate to the vertebrate host, and (in 1856) the discovery of parthenogenesis in insects. He also published work on medusae, other cestodes and trematodes, and strepsipterans.

His collection of worm specimens was purchased for the Helminth Collection of the Natural History Museum in London in 1851. His fish collection (1804–1855), specializing in freshwater fishes of Bavaria, was deposited at the Zoological Cabinet of the Bavarian State in 1863, and though most were lost in WWII, some specimens remain at the Zoologische Staatssammlung in Munich.

== Family ==
He married twice: in 1831 to Fanny Noldechen (d.1854) and in 1855 to Antoynie Noldechen (her younger sister).

His father was cousin (some say younger brother) to the naturalist and physician Philipp Franz von Siebold.

== Principal publications ==
- Observationes de Salamandris et Tritonibus (1828)
- Beiträge zur Naturgeschichte der wirbellosen Thiere (Contributions to the natural history of invertebrates; Danzig, 1839)
- Lehrbuch der vergleichenden Anatomie der Wirbellossen Thiere (Manual of comparative anatomy of invertebrates; Berlin, 1848, by C. T. E. von Siebold), being the first volume of Lehrbuch der Vergleichenden Anatomie (Manual of comparative anatomy; edited by C. T. E. von Siebold and H. Stannius, 1846–48); however, it was published after the second volume, Lehrbuch der vergleichenden Anatomie der Wirbelthiere (Manual of comparative anatomy of vertebrates; Berlin, 1846, by H. Stanius), leading to confusion regarding the correct date of the works
- Ueber die Band- und Blasenwürmer (1854)
- Wahre Parthenogenesis bei Schmetterlingen und Bienen (True parthenogenesis in moths and bees; 1856; English trans. 1857)
- Die Süsswasserfische Mitteleuropas (Freshwater fish of Central Europe; Leipzig, 1863) Here he points out some of the hybrid forms.
- Beiträge zur Parthenogenesis der Arthropoden (Contributions on the parthenogenesis of Arthropods; 1871) Here he established the fact of parthenogenesis in two wasps, in a saw fly, in several moths, and in certain phyllopod crustacea.

== See also ==
- Category:Taxa named by Karl Theodor Ernst von Siebold

== Animals named after Siebold ==
- Ergasilus sieboldi von Nordmann, 1832
- Lineola sieboldii (Kölliker, 1845) Gerlach & Riemann, 1974
- Pegantha sieboldi (Haeckel, 1879)
- Trichosphaerium sieboldi Schneider, 1878
- Stenostomum sieboldi von Graff, 1878
- Colobomatus sieboldi (Richiardi, 1877)
- Hyalonema sieboldi Gray, 1835

Source: Hans G. Hansson, Biographical Etymology of Marine Organism Names, Tjärnö Marine Biol. Lab., Sweden.

Two snakes:

- Geophis sieboldi Jan, 1862
- Amphiesma sieboldii (Günther, 1860)
