= Edward Griffith (zoologist) =

English lawyer and naturalist

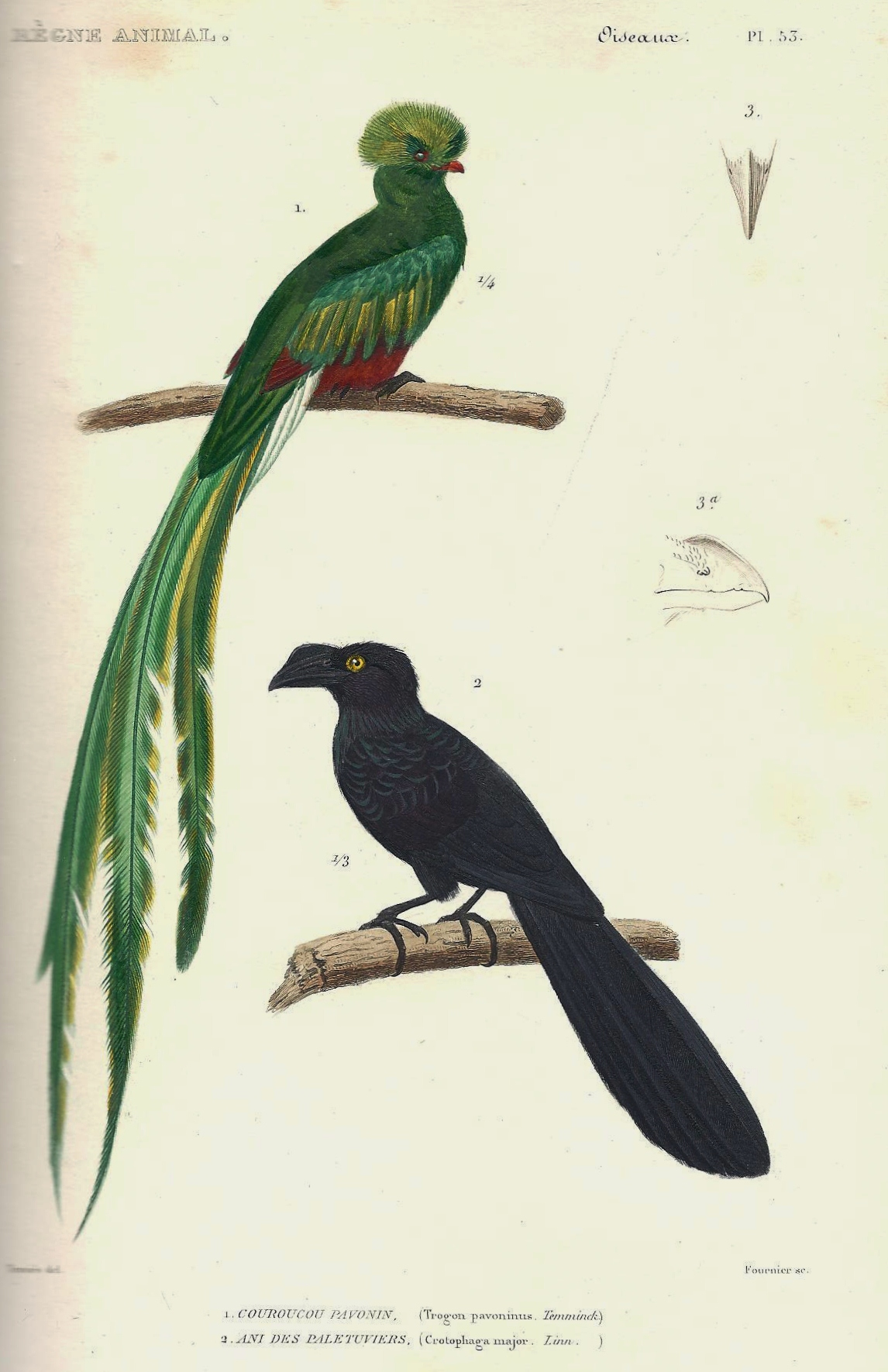
Plate from Règne animal

Edward Griffith (1790–1858) was a British naturalist and solicitor. He wrote General and Particular Descriptions of the Vertebrated Animals (1821) and translated Georges Cuvier's Règne animal, making considerable additions (1827–35).

== Life ==
The son of William Griffith of Stanwell, Middlesex, he entered St. Paul's School, London in 1800 and left it in 1806, entering the Common Pleas office as a clerk. He afterwards became a solicitor and a master in the Court of Common Pleas. He was one of the original members of the Zoological Society, and a fellow of the Linnean (1822), Antiquaries, and Royal Societies. Griffith died on 8 January 1858.

== Works ==
In 1821 he published the first part of what was intended to be an extensive work, ‘General and Particular Descriptions of the Vertebrated Animals,’ with coloured plates. This first part dealt only with monkeys and lemurs. Incomplete, it may have been abandoned in favour of his translation of Cuvier's ‘Animal Kingdom,’ with considerable additions, in fifteen volumes. This work, which is described as containing ‘descriptions of all the species hitherto named and of many not before noticed,’ was published between 1827 and 1834, Griffith being the chief editor, assisted by Major Charles Hamilton Smith and Edward Pidgeon in the part dealing with the mammalia, by Edward Pidgeon with the mollusca, by John Edward Gray with birds. and by George Robert Gray with insects. The work is extensively illustrated with coloured plates. It introduces many new names.

In addition to scientific works, Griffith published two others of a professional character. The first was ‘A Collection of Ancient Records relating to the Borough of Huntingdon, with Observations illustrative of the History of Parliamentary Boroughs in General,’ London, 1827 [misprinted 1727], arising out of an election petition, and urging that the borough franchise rightly belonged to all burgesses or resident householders paying scot and lot, and not, as held by a parliamentary committee, to the corporation. The other, published in 1831, is entitled "Cases of supposed Exemption from Poor Rates claimed on the ground of Extraparochiality, with a … Sketch of the Ancient History of the Parish of St. Andrew, Holborn".

== See also ==
- Category:Taxa named by Edward Griffith (zoologist)
