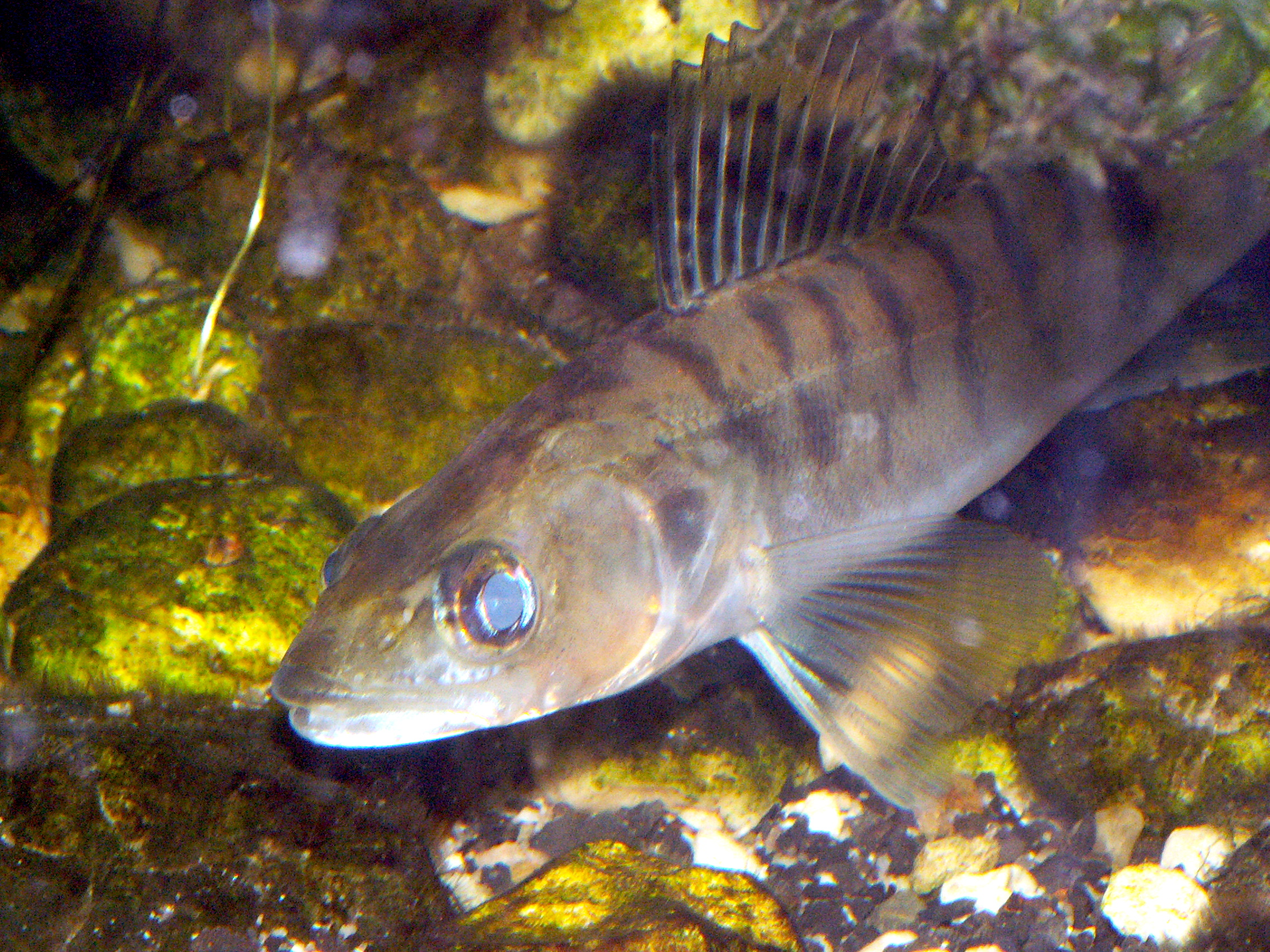
- Zander Sander lucioperca
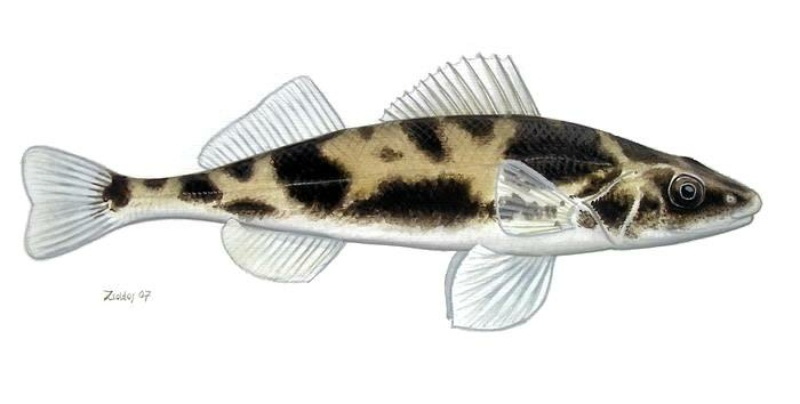
- Zingel Zingel zingel

Scientific classification
- Kingdom: Animalia
- Phylum: Chordata
- Class: Actinopterygii
- Order: Perciformes
- Family: Percidae
- Subfamily: Luciopercinae; Jordan and Evermann, 1896

Tribes
- see text

= Luciopercinae =

Luciopercinae Temporal range: Middle Miocene to recent

Subfamily of fishes

The Luciopercinae is a subfamily of ray-finned fish, classified within the family Percidae, the subfamily includes the pike-perches and zingels. The pike-perches of the genus Sander have an Holarctic distribution while the zingels of the tribe Romanichthyini are found in Europe. They are largely freshwater species but some can be found in brackish water.

== Characteristics ==
The species within the Luciopercinae have a number of morphological characteristics in common. These are the possession of weak spines in the anal fin, the lateral line extending as far as the margin of the caudal fin and additional lines over and under the main lateral line, having a cleithrum which does not have serrations on the pectoral girdle, and having a vertebra count of 41–50.

== Distribution ==
The Luciopercinae has a Holarctic distribution, the pike-perches of the genus Sander are found in Eurasia and North America and includes such commercially important species as the zander (Sander lucioperca) and the walleye (Sander vitreus). On the other hand the tribe Romanichthyini is restricted to Eastern Europe where the species within the tribe are all endemic to the fast flowing streams of the Danube drainage basin.

== Systematics ==
The subfamily is classified into two tribes and three genera, as set out below, containing a total of 10 species:

- Tribe Luciopercini Jordan & Evermann 1896
  - Genus †Leobergia Schtylko, 1934
  - Genus Sander Oken, 1817
- Tribe Romanichthyini Dumitrescu, Bănărescu & Stoica 1957
  - Genus Romanichthys Dumitrescu, Bănărescu & Stoica 1957
  - Genus Zingel Cloquet, 1817

The earliest known fossils of this subfamily are partial jaw and vertebrae elements of Sander from the middle Miocene (Barstovian)-aged Wood Mountain Formation of Saskatchewan, Canada. The extinct genus Leobergia is known from the Miocene and Pliocene of Ukraine, Kazakhstan, and Russia (Siberia).
