= Chinese loach =

Chinese loach may refer to any of several loaches and hillstream loaches, including:

- Beaufortia kweichowensis
- Misgurnus anguillicaudatus
- Misgurnus mizolepis
- Sinibotia pulchra
- Paramisgurnus dabryanus
