= Bibarba bibarba =

Conservation status
- Least Concern (IUCN 3.1)

Scientific classification
- Kingdom: Animalia
- Phylum: Chordata
- Class: Actinopterygii
- Order: Cypriniformes
- Family: Cobitidae
- Genus: Bibarba
- Species: B. bibarba

Binomial name
- Bibarba bibarba Y. X. Chen & Y. F. Chen, 2007

Species of ray-finned fish

Bibarba bibarba is a species of loach that is found in the Chengjiang River of the Long River system in China. It is the only known congener of Bibarba parvoculus, a troglobitic species described in 2015, from which it is believed to have evolutionarily split in the Early Miocene.

== Description ==
B. bibarba is a surface-dwelling species with normal eyes. Males display a duplication of the lamina circularis on the second and third pectoral rays. The coracoid, mesocoracoid, and scapula are stouter in males, and the three bones are fused with the cleithrum. It differs from B. parvoculus, by having lower vertebral counts, a narrower anterior part of the frontal bone at the orbital region, and increased sexual dimorphism.
