= Rubina Nature Reserve =

Protected area in Estonia

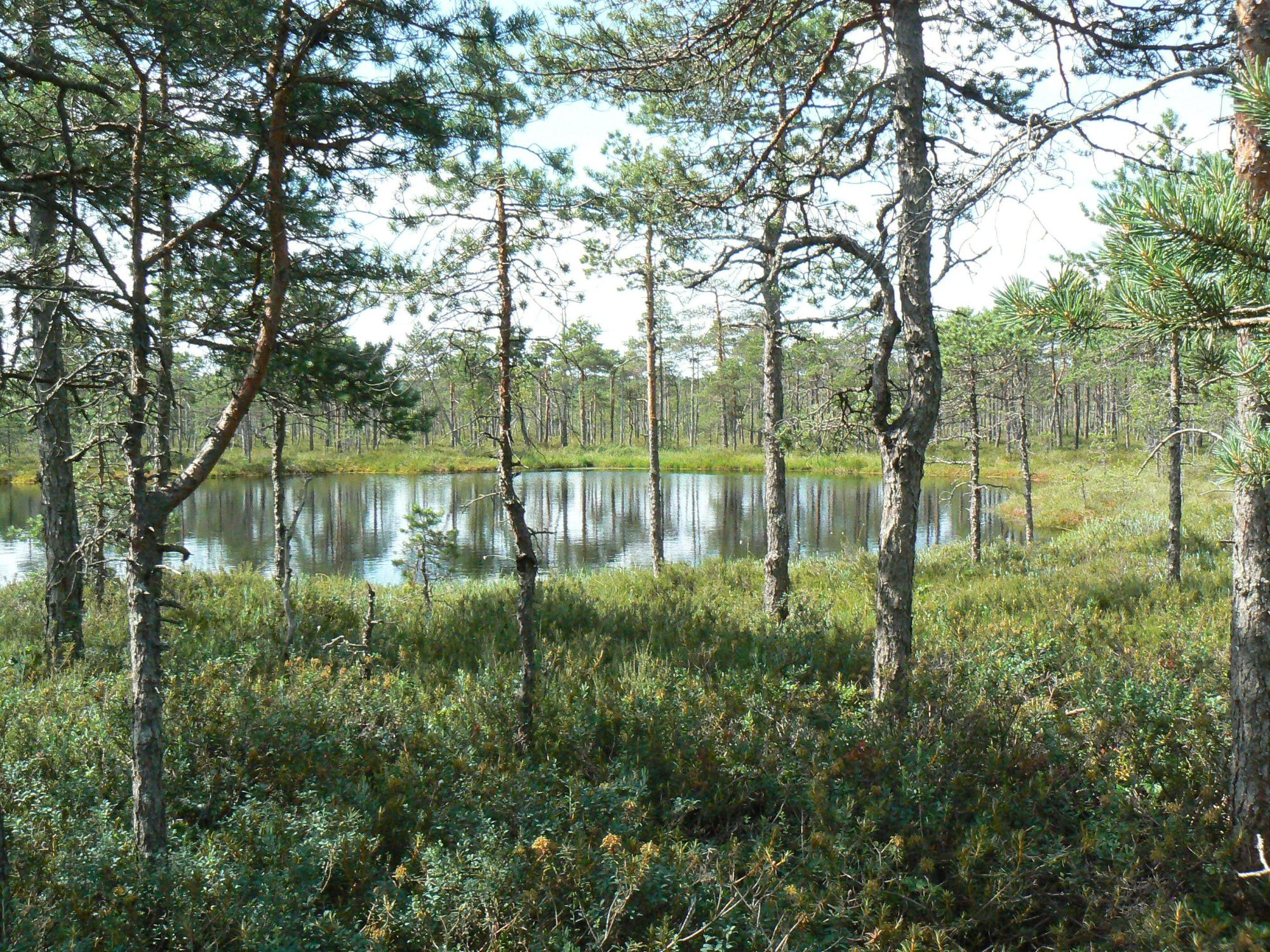

- Location within Estonia
- Location: Estonia
- Nearest city: Viljandi
- Coordinates: 58°04′02″N 25°46′00″E
- Area: 2,097 ha (5,180 acres)
- Established: 2005

Rubina Nature Reserve (Estonian: Rubina looduskaitseala) is a nature reserve in Viljandi County in southern Estonia.

The nature reserve is aimed at protecting the rare forested wetland landscape in the area, and the flora and fauna that thrives there. The area, rich in bogs, swamps and lakes, is an important resting place for migratory birds, but also supports a permanent population of birds such as black stork and white-tailed eagle. The wetlands in the area also support fish, such as the protected European weatherfish (Misgurnus fossilis). The flora in the nature reserve is notable for the large number of unusual orchids that can be found there.
