= Acantopsis spectabilis =

Conservation status
- Data Deficient (IUCN 3.1)

Scientific classification
- Kingdom: Animalia
- Phylum: Chordata
- Class: Actinopterygii
- Order: Cypriniformes
- Family: Cobitidae
- Genus: Acantopsis
- Species: A. spectabilis

Binomial name
- Acantopsis spectabilis (Blyth, 1860)

Species of fish

Acantopsis spectabilis is a species of fish found in Thailand. The species is known from the Irrawaddy River and Salween River in Thailand and Myanmar and possibly the Chindwin River. There are no known conservation actions and the species is thought to be threatened by planned dams on the rivers it inhabits.
