= Lepidocephalichthys jonklaasi =

Conservation status
- Endangered (IUCN 3.1)

Scientific classification
- Kingdom: Animalia
- Phylum: Chordata
- Class: Actinopterygii
- Division: Teleostei
- Order: Cypriniformes
- Family: Cobitidae
- Genus: Lepidocephalichthys
- Species: L. jonklaasi

Binomial name
- Lepidocephalichthys jonklaasi (Deraniyagala, 1956)

Synonyms
- Lepidocephalichthys thermalis jonklaasi

Species of fish

Lepidocephalichthys jonklaasi, known as the Jonklaas's loach or the spotted loach, is an endemic fish species restricted to the wet zone of Sri Lanka. The species was first recorded from the Wilpita area (Daraniyagala 1952). It is currently known from 12 locations in the wet zone including Beraliya, Dombagaskandha, Madakada, Gilimale, Hiyare, Kottawa, Kanneliya, Weddagala, Nakiyadeniya, Pahiyangala and Boralugoda. It is recorded from a wide range of altitudes. Due to its restricted range and the threats to its habitat Lepidocephalichthys jonklaasi, is listed as an Endangered species. The species has already begun to disappear from some of the sites mentioned above due to destruction and fragmentation of its habitat and many other threats that are operating on the species.

Named in honor of Rodney Jonklaas (1925–1989), a Sri Lankan diver who was an underwater photographer and also a zoo administrator.

== Morphology ==
Members of the genus Lepidocephalichthys have a sharp, erectile spine on their cheeks. In some species the spine is sharp enough to puncture easily one's hand during handling of the live fish. However, it is not venomous or harmful. These fish have an ancillary respiratory mechanism where they swallow air, which is then used to oxygenate the blood that passes through the walls of the intestines. Unlike the case of the channids and anabantids, the air is not expelled through the mouth or gills, but via the anus. This enables them to survive in very poorly oxygenated water although in Sri Lanka, by and large, they occur in habitats that do not require this facility and are not generally considered as "air breathers". The loaches are small, eel-like or worm-like fish, often attractively colored. They have (often rudimentary) cycloid scales and three pairs of barbells. Mature males in many species have highly modified pectoral fins (Roberts, 1989). Little is known about the breeding habits of the members of this family Cobitidae and only a few species have been bred in captivity to date.

=== Related species and diagnosis ===
Also Lepidocephalichthys thermalis is found in Sri Lanka. Jayaram (1981) reports that at least six other species occur in the north-eastern part of India (Assam to Burma). Tilak & Hussain (1981) have written a review on the systematics of the Indian members of the genus.

Lepidocephalichthys jonklaasi is distinguished from L. furcatus, L. micropogon, L. manipurensis, and L. goalparensis by rounded/truncated (vs. forked) caudal fin, from L. irrorata and L. kranos by absence of scales on top of head, from L. guntea, L. hasselti, L. tomaculum, L. alkaia, and L. annandalei by broad regularly spaced dark bars (vs. reticulations, spots, or stripe) on caudal fin, from L. thermalis, L. arunachalensis, L. coromandelensis, and L. berdmorei by vertically elongated, dark spots on side that form irregular, thin bars (vs. round spots that sometimes form squares or thin stripe), and from L. lorentzi by thinner, more irregularly spaced dark side bars, dorsal-fin origin anterior (vs. posterior) to pelvic-fin origin, and larger size (to 45 vs. 33 mm SL), (Havird & Page 2010).

The two Sri Lankan species L. jonklaasi and L.thermalis are not very closely related. They are easily differentiated by body shape and proportions, colour pattern, and form of sexual dimorphism that is unique to L. jonklaasi. Further, a mature adult L. jonklaasi is significantly longer than L. thermalis. It is not easily confused with L. thermalis owing to its distinctive colour pattern and robust, tubular body.

Colouration

The sides are yellow, darkening dorsally, and are mottled with several chaotically arranged, large spots.

Secondary sexual characters

Daraniyagala 1956, and De Silva 1963, observed that the last pectoral fin ray was ossified in some specimens, but did not consider this as a secondary sexual character. However, it is in fact present only in males and can therefore be used to differentiate between males and females.

== Reproduction ==
Breeding of this has not observed either in the wild or captive conditions.

== Habitat and microhabitats ==
Very little is known of the biology of this species. It has been recorded by Pethiyagoda only from its type locality in Wilpita, Akuressa. This stream traverses through thick forest with dense undergrowth. The stream is very shallow and the substrate is entirely of fallen leaves and silt. The flow of water in the stream is very slow, in terms of volume perhaps only several litres per minute. The fish are not visible from the surface, being always concealed beneath leaf debris in the water.

== Distribution ==
L. jonklaasi was originally described in 1952 by PEP Daraniyagala as member of the genus Lepidocephalus (synonymous with Lepidocephalichthys). The locus typicus is Wilpita Estate near Akuressa in the southern wet zone of Sri Lanka, 500m above sea level. Since then Pethiyagoda reported four additional localities of this species. This species was named in 1956 by Deraniyagala and in 1963 it was reconfirmed by De Silva presenting sufficient data.

There are only 12 site records for this species to date; it's elevated between highest 1000 feet at Gilimale and lowest 350 feet at Hiyare, which belongs to southern-west wet zone in Sri Lanka. Diminutive is known about the biology and ecology of this species. This more important as the species has already begun to disappear from number of its recorded locations and soon will be threatened with extinction. Therefore, the sooner the habitats are restored and protected the better to ensure the long-term survival of the species.

== Conservation status ==
According to the 2007 red list of threatened fauna and flora of Sri Lanka, Lepidocephalichthys jonklaasi (Deraniyagala, 1956) is listed in the Endangered category. In the previous redlist published in 2002 it was listed as Endangered as well. In the 1999 red list it has been listed as Threatened species. L. jonklaasi is listed as protected fish, by the fauna and flora protection ordinance.

Most of factors that have pushed the species towards extinction are interrelated with each other, such as habitat degradation. Due to the changes in land use pattern with increased human population, forest cover of Sri Lanka has reduced from 70% to about 22% of its land area during the twentieth century (anon. 1991). Deforestation, improper cultivation practices in upper catchment areas of drainage basins of rivers and gem mining cause heavy siltation in streams and rivers. Further, as a result of deforestation the shade that is much needed by Lepidocephalichthys jonklaasi (Pethiyagoda 1991) has been lost. These threats should be minimized through appropriate strategies in order to ensure the survival of this endemic freshwater fish.

== Utility ==
Lepidocephalichthys jonklaasi is too rare to be of value to the aquarium fish trade which, in any case, exports large numbers of the superficially very similar L. thermalis.
