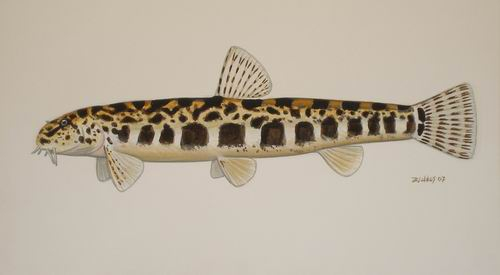

Conservation status
- Least Concern (IUCN 3.1)

Scientific classification
- Kingdom: Animalia
- Phylum: Chordata
- Class: Actinopterygii
- Order: Cypriniformes
- Family: Cobitidae
- Genus: Sabanejewia
- Species: S. aurata

Binomial name
- Sabanejewia aurata (De Filippi, 1863)

Subspecies
- S. a. aralensis, (Aral Spined Loach) - Aral Sea; S. a. aurata, (Golden Spined Loach) - (Caspian Sea basin, Don river)

Synonyms
- Cobitis aurata De Filippi, 1863; Cobitis hohenackeri Kessler, 1877; Cobitis aralensis Kessler, 1877

= Sabanejewia aurata =

Species of fish

Sabanejewia aurata also known as the golden spined loach, is a species of ray-finned fish in the loach family Cobitidae. It is found in Afghanistan, Armenia, Azerbaijan, Bulgaria, Croatia, Georgia, Hungary, Iran, Romania, Russia, Ukraine, and Uzbekistan.
