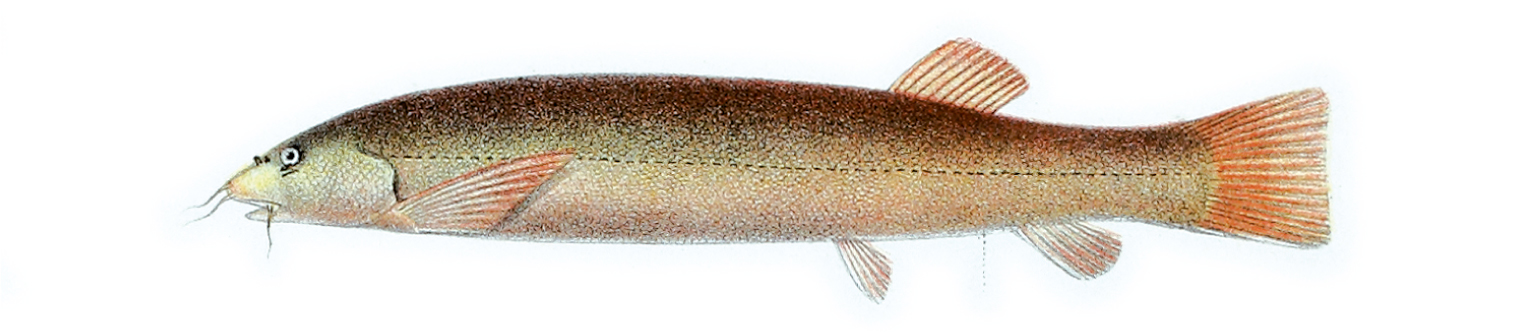
- Lepidocephalus macrochir

Scientific classification
- Kingdom: Animalia
- Phylum: Chordata
- Class: Actinopterygii
- Order: Cypriniformes
- Family: Cobitidae
- Genus: Lepidocephalus; Bleeker, 1859

Type species
- Cobitis macrochir Bleeker, 1854

= Lepidocephalus =

Genus of fishes

Lepidocephalus is a genus of loaches native to rivers in the Southeast Asian countries of Indonesia, Malaysia and Thailand and Manipur, north east India. Members of this genus are known as "spirit loaches". They resemble the related kuhli loaches and Lepidocephalichthys loaches (some species in the latter genus were formerly placed in Lepidocephalus), but are more robust and generally found deep in large rivers. With little or no light in their habitat, their eyes and pigmentation are reduced to various extent. One species, L. spectrum, completely lacks pigment and eyes, similar to cavefish. They are generally poorly known, but based on the relatively few scientific museum specimens they can reach up to 8 cm (3.1 in) in standard length.

== Species ==
There are currently 5 recognized species in this genus.

- Lepidocephalus macrochir Bleeker, 1854 (Indonesian spirit loach)
- Lepidocephalus nanensis Deein, Tangjitjaroen & Page, 2014 (Thai spirit loach)
- Lepidocephalus pallens Vaillant, 1902 (Pallid spirit loach)
- Lepidocephalus pahangensis de Beaufort, 1933 (Pahang spirit loach)
- Lepidocephalus spectrum T. R. Roberts, 1989 (Blind spirit loach)
