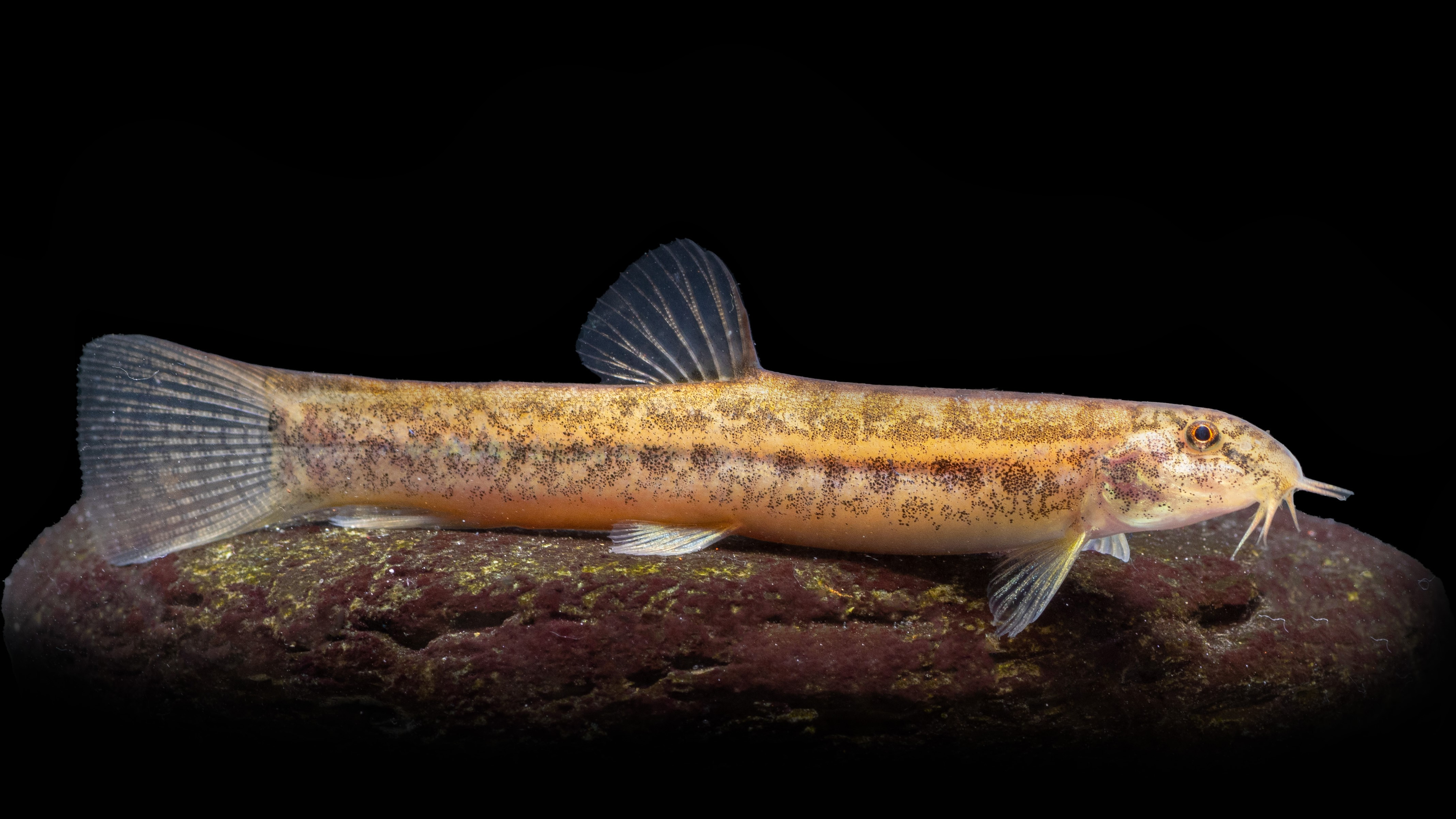

Conservation status
- Least Concern (IUCN 3.1)

Scientific classification
- Domain: Eukaryota
- Kingdom: Animalia
- Phylum: Chordata
- Class: Actinopterygii
- Order: Cypriniformes
- Family: Cobitidae
- Genus: Lepidocephalichthys
- Species: L. guntea

Binomial name
- Lepidocephalichthys guntea (F. Hamilton, 1822)

Synonyms
- List: Cobitis balgara Hamilton, 1822; Cobitis Maya Sykes, 1839; Canthophrys vittatus Swainson, 1839; Canthophrys olivaceus Swainson, 1839; Cobitis phoxocheila M'Clelland, 1839; Misgurnus lateralis Günther, 1868; Lepidocephalus dibruensis Sen, 1979; Lepidocephalichthys nepalensis Shrestha, 1981

= Lepidocephalichthys guntea =

Guntea loach

Species of fish

Lepidocephalichthys guntea, also known as guntea loach, scavenger loach or peppered loach, is a species of cobitid loach native to southern and south-eastern Asia. This species reaches a length of 15 centimetres (5.9 in) TL. It uses its intestines to breathe, which gives it the ability to adapt to live in a variety of stagnant and flowing environments. This fish is found in the aquarium trade.

== See also ==
- Media related to Lepidocephalichthys guntea at Wikimedia Commons
