= Lepidocephalus spectrum =

Conservation status
- Vulnerable (IUCN 3.1)

Scientific classification
- Kingdom: Animalia
- Phylum: Chordata
- Class: Actinopterygii
- Division: Teleostei
- Order: Cypriniformes
- Family: Cobitidae
- Genus: Lepidocephalus
- Species: L. spectrum

Binomial name
- Lepidocephalus spectrum Roberts, 1989

Species of fish

Lepidocephalus spectrum is a species of fish in the family Cobitidae. It lacks eyes and pigmentation, similar to cavefishes, but is endemic to the Kapuas River basin of Borneo.
