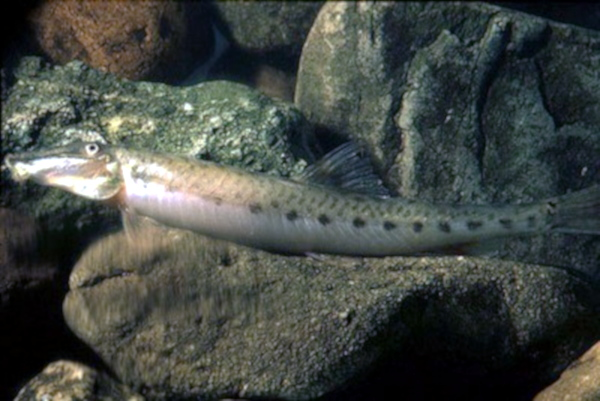

Conservation status
- Vulnerable (IUCN 3.1)

Scientific classification
- Kingdom: Animalia
- Phylum: Chordata
- Class: Actinopterygii
- Order: Cypriniformes
- Family: Cobitidae
- Genus: Acantopsis
- Species: A. octoactinotos

Binomial name
- Acantopsis octoactinotos Siebert, 1991

= Acantopsis octoactinotos =

Species of fish

Acantopsis octoactinotos, the long-nosed loach, is a freshwater fish from Indonesia, commonly found in aquariums.

Acantopsis octoactinotos has a long straight snout, unlike the similar Horseface loach (Acantopsis choirorhynchus), in which the snout has a down-turned shape. The long-nosed loach reaches 4.5 inches (110 mm) in length, males typically being smaller and slenderer than females.
