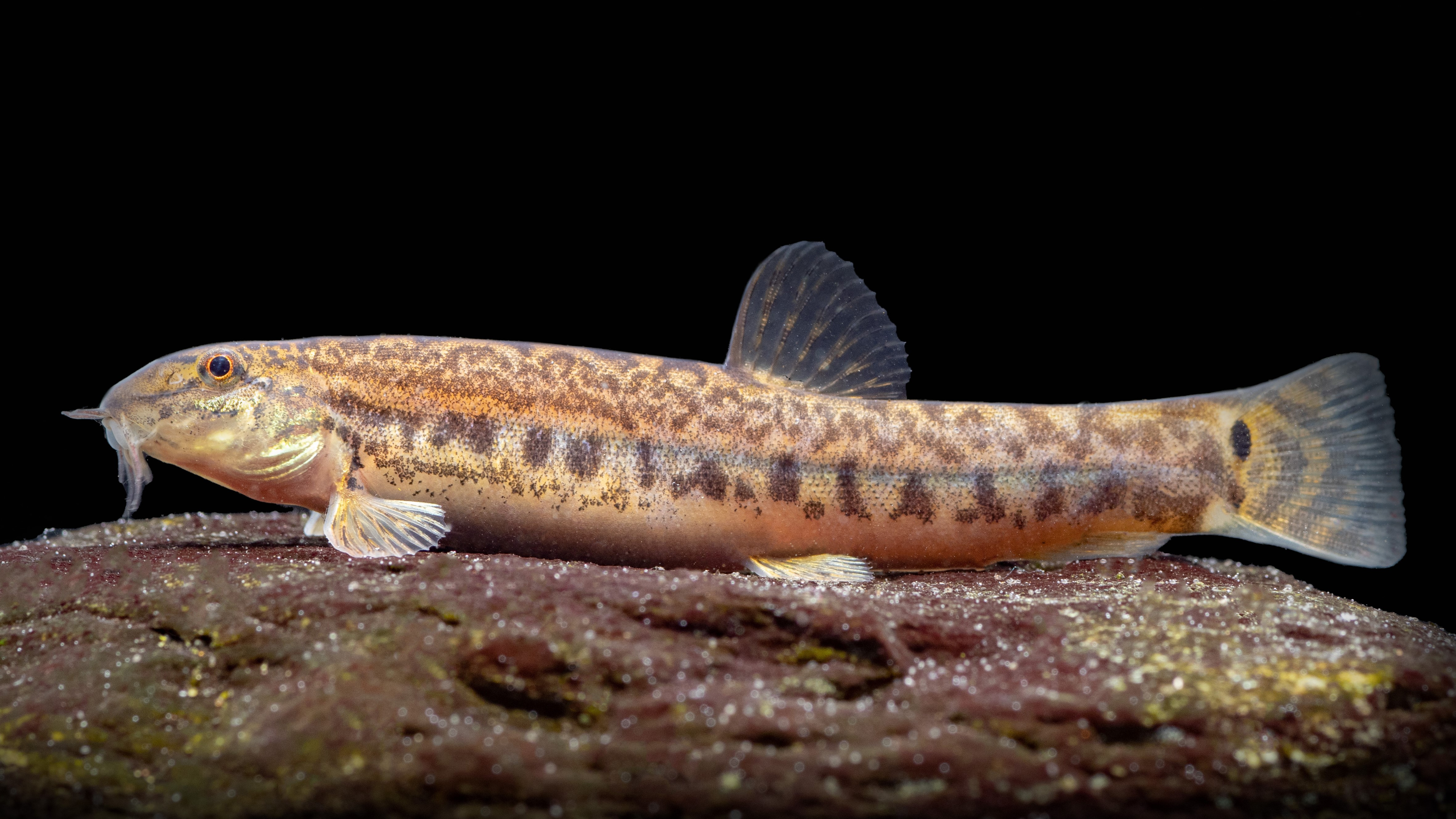

Conservation status
- Least Concern (IUCN 3.1)

Scientific classification
- Kingdom: Animalia
- Phylum: Chordata
- Class: Actinopterygii
- Order: Cypriniformes
- Family: Cobitidae
- Genus: Lepidocephalichthys
- Species: L. thermalis

Binomial name
- Lepidocephalichthys thermalis (Valenciennes, 1846)

Synonyms
- List Cobitis carnaticus Jerdon, 1849 Cobitis carnaticus Jerdon, 1849 Cobitis mysorensis Jerdon, 1849 Cobitis mysorensis Jerdon, 1849 Cobitis rubripinnis Jerdon, 1849 Cobitis rubripinnis Jerdon, 1849 Cobitis thermalis Valenciennes, 1846 Cobitis thermalis Valenciennes, 1846 Lepidocephalichthys thermalis (Valenciennes, 1846) Lepidocephalichthys thermalis (Valenciennes, 1846) Platacanthus agrensis Day, 1865 Platacanthus agrensis Day, 1865

= Lepidocephalichthys thermalis =

Species of fish

Lepidocephalichthys thermalis, known as common spiny loach or spotted loach, is a species of freshwater fish found in India and Sri Lanka.

They are found usually in quiet, flowing waters with a sandy substrate. It grows to 38 cm (15 in) standard length.

The species name, thermalis, references the fact that the type locality of this species was the Kanniya Hot Springs from Sri Lanka. However, this species is not exclusively restricted to hot springs.

== Related species and diagnosis ==
Also endemic Lepidocephalichthys jonklaasi is found in Sri Lanka. Jayaram (1981) reports that at least six other species occur in the north-eastern part of India (Assam to Burma). Tilak and Hussain (1981) have written a review on the systematics of the Indian members of the genus.

Lepidocephalichthys jonklaasi is distinguished from L. furcatus, L. micropogon, L. manipurensis, and L. goalparensis by rounded/truncated (vs. forked) caudal fin, from L. irrorata and L. kranos by absence of scales on top of head, from L. guntea, L. hasselti, L. tomaculum, L. alkaia, and L. annandalei by broad regularly spaced dark bars (vs. reticulations, spots, or stripe) on caudal fin, from L. thermalis, L. arunachalensis, L. coromandelensis, and L. berdmorei by vertically elongated, dark spots on side that form irregular, thin bars (vs. round spots that sometimes form squares or thin stripe), and from L. lorentzi by thinner, more irregularly spaced dark side bars, dorsal-fin origin anterior (vs. posterior) to pelvic-fin origin, and larger size (to 45 vs. 33 mm SL), (Havird and Page 2010).

The two Sri Lankan species, L. jonklaasi and L. thermalis, are not very closely related. They are easily differentiated by body shape and proportions, colour pattern, and form of sexual dimorphism that is unique to L. jonklaasi. Further, a mature adult L. jonklaasi is significantly longer than L. thermalis. It is not easily confused with L. thermalis owing to its distinctive colour pattern and robust, tubular body.
