= Sabanejewia romanica =

Conservation status
- Vulnerable (IUCN 3.1)

Scientific classification
- Kingdom: Animalia
- Phylum: Chordata
- Class: Actinopterygii
- Order: Cypriniformes
- Family: Cobitidae
- Genus: Sabanejewia
- Species: S. romanica

Binomial name
- Sabanejewia romanica (Băcescu, 1943)

Synonyms
- Cobitis romanica Bacescu, 1943

Species of fish

Sabanejewia romanica, also known as Romanian loach, is a species of cyprinid fish in the family Cobitidae. It was originally placed in the genus Cobitis.

== Location ==
It is endemic to Romania, occurring in the upper and middle reaches of several Danube tributaries, including the Argeș, Olt, Jiu, Mureș, and Târnava (Tapolitza) river systems.

== Size ==
This species reaches a length of 10.5 cm (4.1 in).

== Etymology ==
The species name incorporates the Latin suffix ‑ica, meaning “belonging to,” in reference to Romania, where it was originally described as a Romanian subspecies of Cobitis (now Sabanejewia) caspia.
