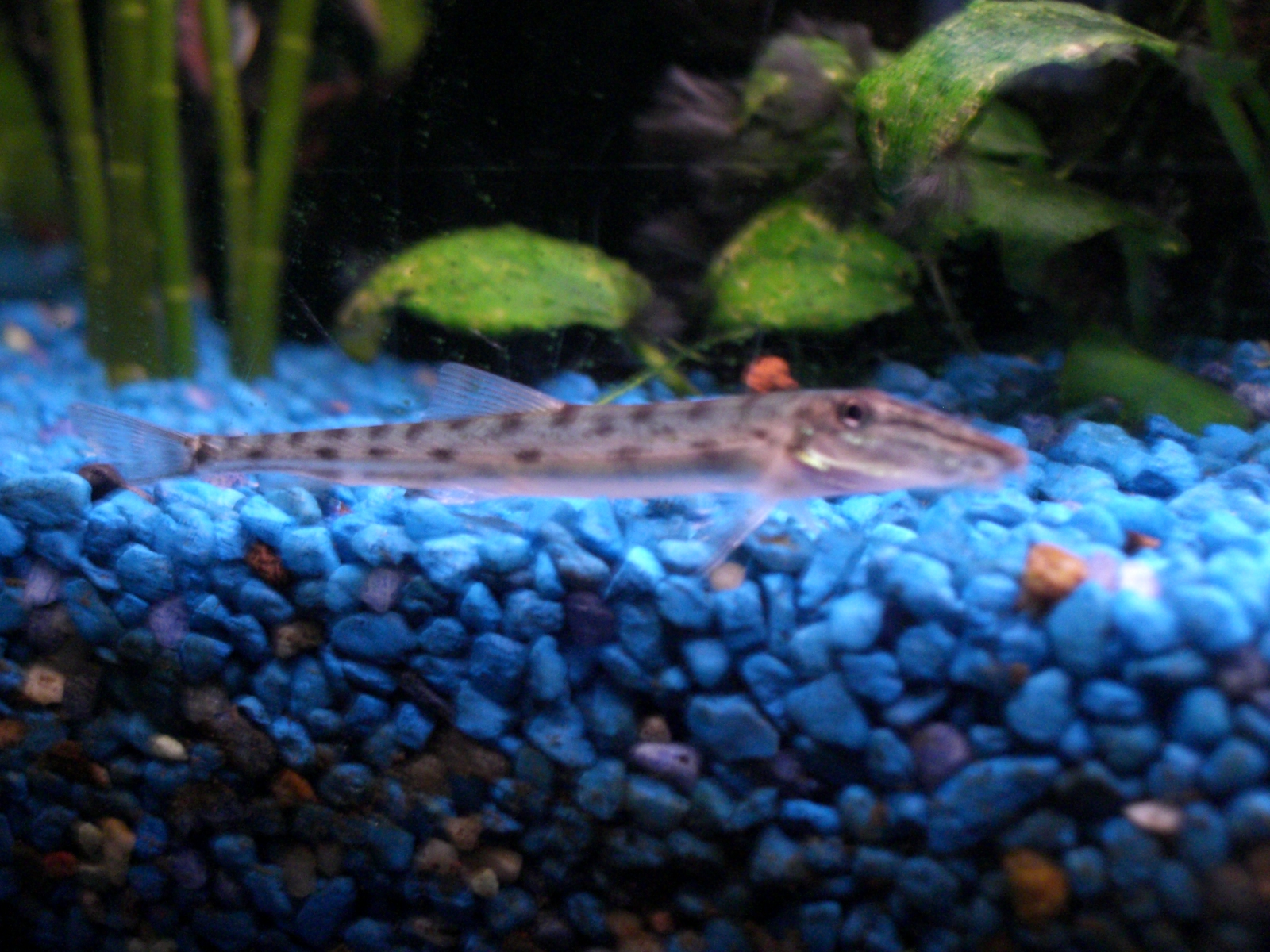

Conservation status
- Least Concern (IUCN 3.1)

Scientific classification
- Kingdom: Animalia
- Phylum: Chordata
- Class: Actinopterygii
- Order: Cypriniformes
- Family: Cobitidae
- Genus: Acantopsis
- Species: A. dialuzona

Binomial name
- Acantopsis dialuzona van Hasselt, 1823

Synonyms
- Acantopsis choirorhynchos (Bleeker, 1854); Cobitis choirorhynchos Bleeker, 1854

= Acantopsis dialuzona =

Species of loach

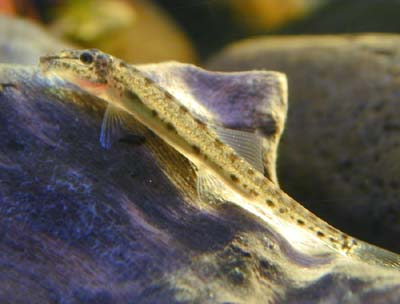
Horseface loach in an aquarium

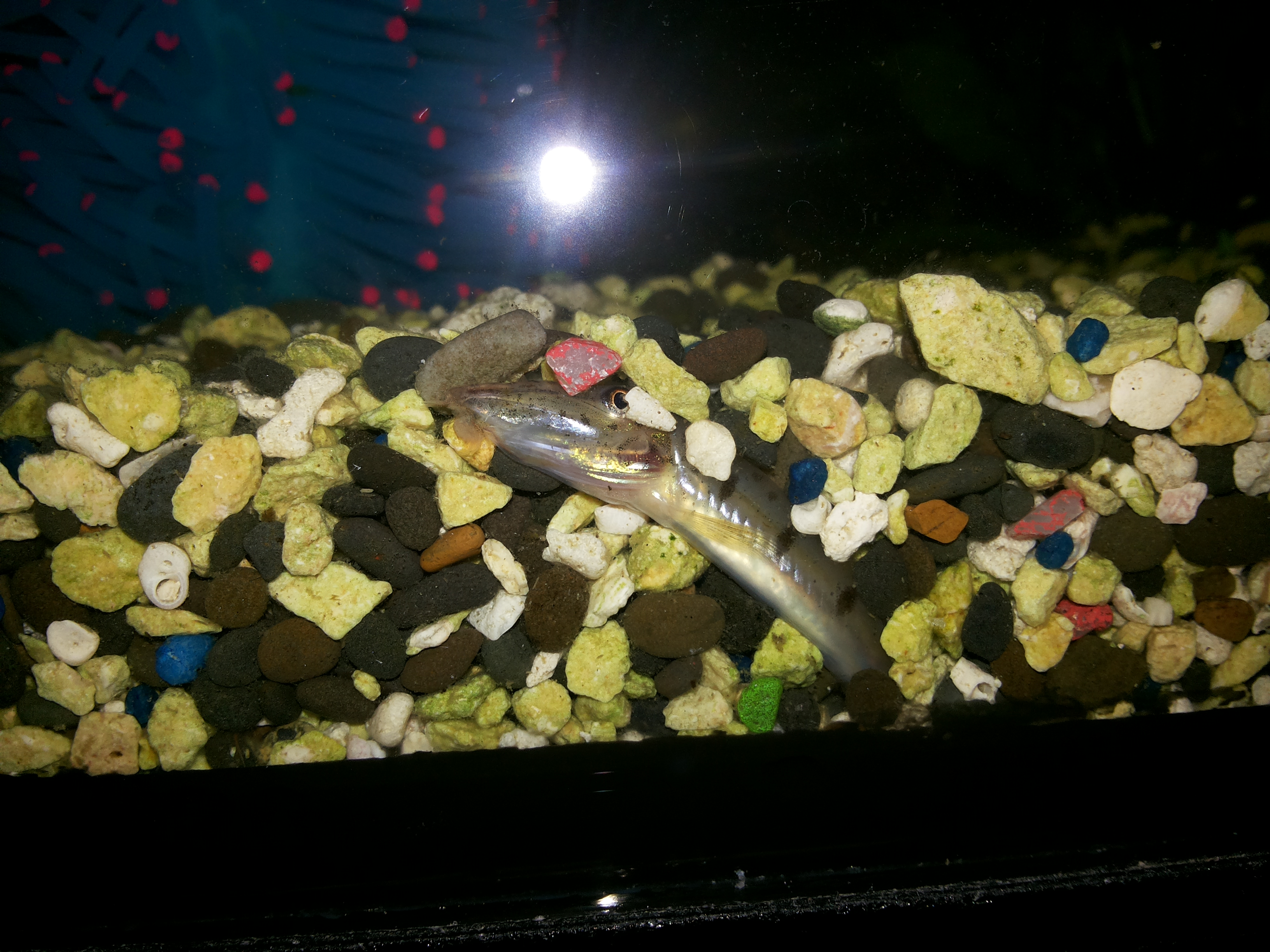
Horseface loach under aquarium gravel

Acantopsis dialuzona is a loach native to the swift, clear streams and rivers of mainland and archipelagic Southeast Asia, Indonesia, Peninsular Malaysia, Thailand, but Southeast Asia outside its range, including as Acantopsis. A. choirorhynchos because of the lack of taxonomic resolution in Acantopsis. It can also be found in flooded fields.

The horseface loach or horsehead loach, formerly known as Acantopsis choirorhynchos, is now recognized as belonging to this species.

== Taxonomy ==
Under Maurice Kottelat's review and revision of the loaches in 2012, this species name is considered to be a junior synonym of A. dialuzona.

== In aquaria ==
A very similar species is the unofficially named longnose loach, Acantopsis octoactinotos, from which the horseface can be distinguished by the latter's down-turned (horse-like) nose. Additionally, the horseface loach buries itself in the bottom substratum (if silt or fine sand); the longnose loach does not. The horseface loach is fast moving; the longnose is rather slow. However, the longnose is more aggressive, regularly feeding on juvenile fishes.

The horseface loach's native substrate is one of sand or gravel, wherein it will characteristically burrow itself. These loaches spend much of their time buried in the substrate, leaving only their eyes uncovered. Due to this incessant burrowing, any live plants should be potted to avoid uprooting. The use of floating plants is recommended, as these loaches prefer subdued lighting. Horseface loaches are not picky eaters, but live food (such as tubifex) is relished.

The horseface loach is most active at night and mostly keeps to itself. It attains a maximum size of 30 centimetres (12 in) in length, but is considered mature from 6 centimetres (2.4 in). As of 1997, it had not been bred in captivity. It was first imported into Europe in 1929 by Edmund Riechers of Hamburg, Germany.

== As food ==
In Thai cuisine, this fish is highly valued for its versatility and is prepared in various ways, including deep-frying until crispy, frying with garlic, sun-drying (known as dad diao), and making spicy salads (yam). It is typically consumed as a side dish accompanying steamed rice or rice porridge. Notably, the horse-faced loach is eaten whole, as its small size and delicate bones make it suitable for consumption in its entirety, providing both flavor and texture that complement traditional Thai meals.

== Local names ==
- Laotian: ອິດ [ít]
- Thai: ปลารากกล้วย [plaː râːk klûaj].

== See also ==
- List of freshwater aquarium fish species

== Bibliography ==
- Baensch, Hans A., and Riehl, Rudiger. (1997). Baensch Aquarium Atlas, Vol. 1. (6th ed.), p. 366. Microcosm Ltd.; Shelburne, Vermont. ISBN 1-890087-05-X
- Froese, Rainer; Pauly, Daniel (eds.). "Acantopsis choirorhynchos". FishBase. May 2005 version.
- "Acantopsis choirorhynchos". Integrated Taxonomic Information System.
