= Microcobitis misgurnoides =

Conservation status
- Data Deficient (IUCN 3.1)

Scientific classification
- Kingdom: Animalia
- Phylum: Chordata
- Class: Actinopterygii
- Division: Teleostei
- Order: Cypriniformes
- Family: Cobitidae
- Genus: Microcobitis
- Species: M. misgurnoides

Binomial name
- Microcobitis misgurnoides (Rendahl (de), 1944)

Synonyms
- Cobitis misgurnoides Rendahl, 1944

Genus of fishes

Microcobitis misgurnoides is a species of freshwater fish in the family Cobitidae, which is endemic to Vietnam and grows to a maximum length of 4.1 cm (1.6 in).
