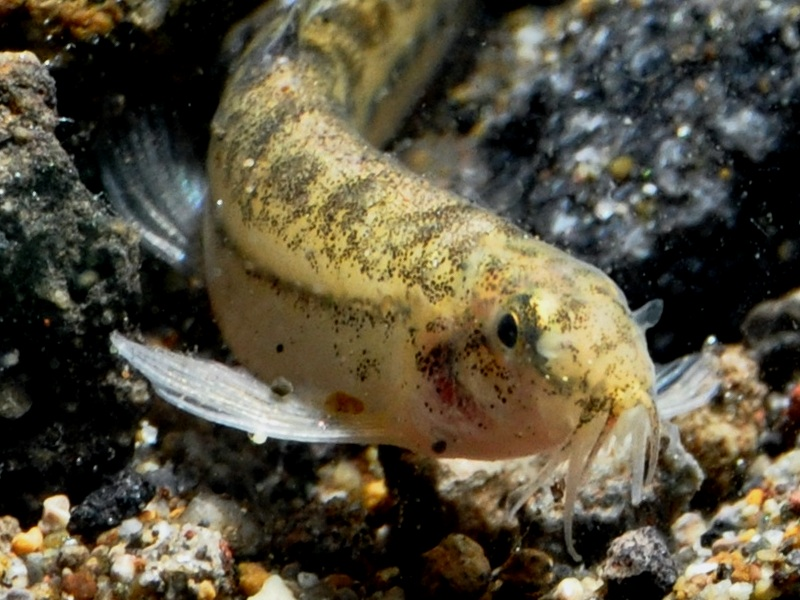
- Lepidocephalichthys hasselti from Banyumas, Central Java

Conservation status
- Least Concern (IUCN 3.1)

Scientific classification
- Kingdom: Animalia
- Phylum: Chordata
- Class: Actinopterygii
- Order: Cypriniformes
- Family: Cobitidae
- Genus: Lepidocephalichthys
- Species: L. hasselti

Binomial name
- Lepidocephalichthys hasselti (Valenciennes, 1846)

Synonyms
- Cobitis octocirrhus Kuhl & van Hasselt 1823 (nomen nudum); Cobitis hasselti Valenciennes 1846 (basionym); Lepidocephalus hasselti Bleeker 1860; Lepidocephalichthys nudus Machan 1931; Lepidocephalus taeniatus Fowler 1939; Acanthophthalmus unistriatus Roberts 1993

= Lepidocephalichthys hasselti =

Species of fish

Lepidocephalichthys hasselti is a species of cobitid loach native to southeastern Asia and western Indonesia. This species reaches a length of 45 millimetres (1.8 in) TL.

Named in honor of Dutch physician and biologist Johan Coenraad van Hasselt (1797-1823), who while exploring the colonial Dutch East Indies in 1820 provided an illustration of this species. Hasselt traveled with his friend Heinrich Kuhl.

== Diagnosis ==
According to Kottelat & Lim 1992, L. hasselti is distinguished from other described species of Lepidocephalichthys in Southeast Asia in usually having an ocellated black spot centered at base of branched caudal rays 3–4; or it replaced by black or darker area. Its size is up to 45 mm (1.8 in) SL; body with a median longitudinal stripe or a row of adjacent black spots, with an unpigmented stripe above it, back marmorated, finely spotted or blotched. Caudal fin with series (usually 3–6) of vertical bars; dorsal origin above posterior extremity of pelvic base.

== Range and conservation status ==
It has a widespread distribution: Burma, Thailand, Laos, Cambodia, Vietnam, and Yunnan; southward through Peninsular Malaysia to western Indonesia (Sumatra, Borneo and Java). IUCN listed it as LC (Least Concern).

== Footnotes ==
- Froese, Rainer; Pauly, Daniel (eds.). "Lepidocephalichthys hasselti". FishBase.
