= Microcobitis =

Scientific classification
- Kingdom: Animalia
- Phylum: Chordata
- Class: Actinopterygii
- Division: Teleostei
- Order: Cypriniformes
- Family: Cobitidae
- Genus: Microcobitis; Bohlen & Harant, 2011

Type species
- Cobitis misgurnoides Rendahl, 1944

Genus of fishes

Microcobitis is a genus of freshwater fish in the family Cobitidae. It contains four species which are endemic to Vietnam and Laos.

== Species ==
The genus consists of:

- Microcobitis guttata (Nguyen, 2006)
- Microcobitis misgurnoides (Rendahl, 1944)
- Microcobitis nuicocensis (Nguyen & Vo, 2006)
- Microcobitis stilaspi Kottelat, 2025
