= Bibarba parvoculus =

Conservation status
- Least Concern (IUCN 3.1)

Scientific classification
- Kingdom: Animalia
- Phylum: Chordata
- Class: Actinopterygii
- Order: Cypriniformes
- Family: Cobitidae
- Genus: Bibarba
- Species: B. parvoculus

Binomial name
- Bibarba parvoculus Wu, Yang & Xiu, 2015

Species of ray-finned fish

Bibarba parvoculus is a cave-dwelling species of loach endemic to a karst cave in Guangxi in southern China. Its only known congener (an organism within the same genus) is the surface-dwelling Bibarba bibarba, from which it is believed to have evolutionarily split in the Early Miocene.

== Description ==
B. parvoculus is a troglobitic species with a depigmented body and reduced eyes. Males display a duplication of the lamina circularis on the second and third pectoral rays. The coracoid, mesocoracoid, and scapula are stouter in males, with the three bones being autogenous (that is, unfused), in contrast to Bibarba bibarba where these bones are fused with the cleithrum. It also differs from B. bibarba, by having a higher number of vertebrae, a broader anterior part of the frontal bone at the orbital region, and decreased sexual dimorphism.
