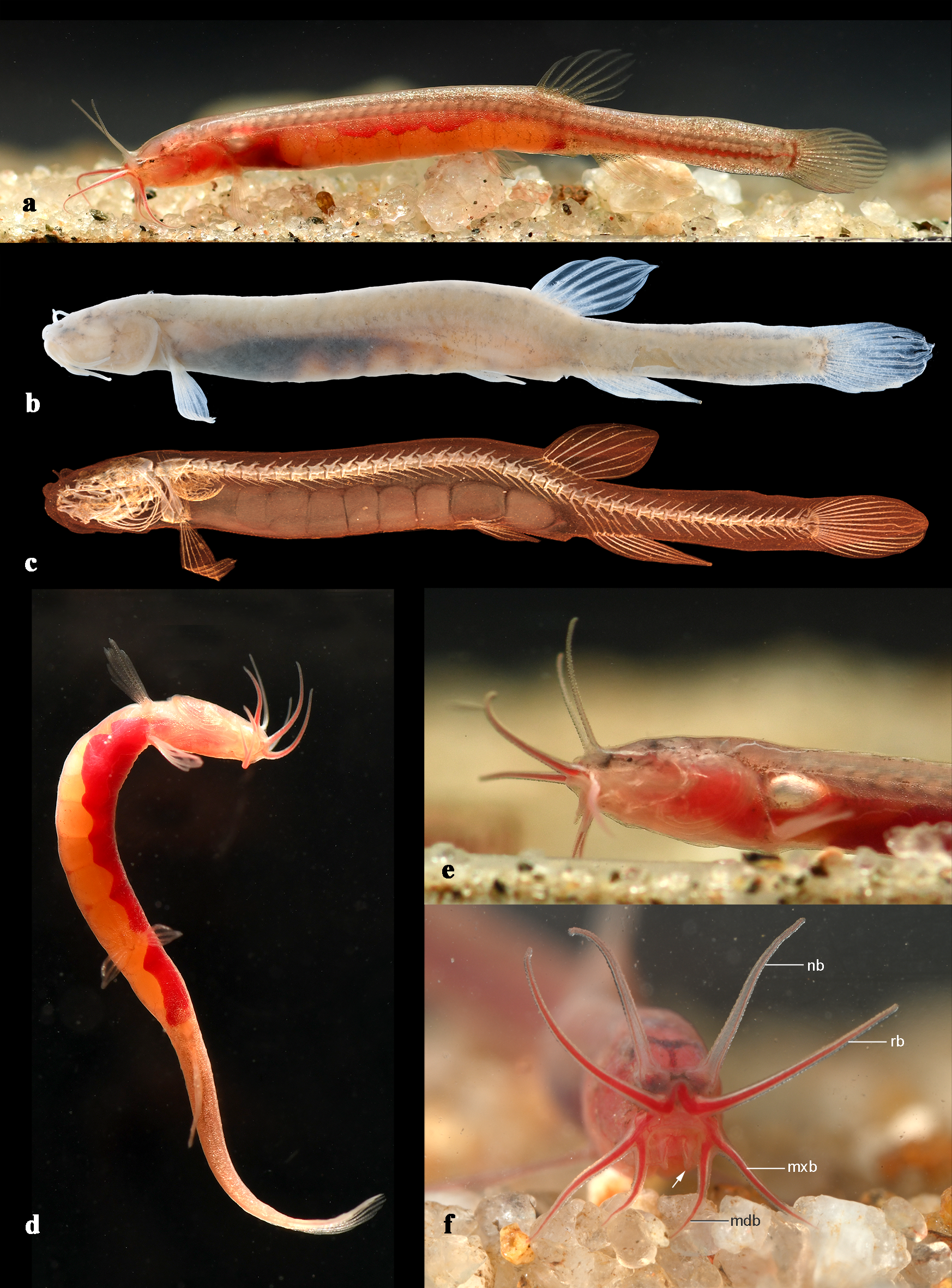
- G. nakana in life (a, d–f), as preserved (b), and μCT-scanned (c)

Scientific classification
- Kingdom: Animalia
- Phylum: Chordata
- Class: Actinopterygii
- Division: Teleostei
- Order: Cypriniformes
- Family: Cobitidae
- Genus: Gitchak; Britz et al., 2026
- Species: G. nakana

Binomial name
- Gitchak nakana Britz et al., 2026

= Gitchak =

Genus of fish

Gitchak (lit. 'red') is a genus of freshwater ray-finned fish in the family Cobitidae (loaches). The genus contains a single species, Gitchak nakana, which is closely related to Lepidocephalichthys and Pangio. Gitchak is endemic to Northeast India, known only from a single dug-out well. As such, it exhibits several unique adaptations to a subterranean lifestyle. These include the lack of functional eyes, the absence of pigmentation, and the presence of well-developed barbels on the face for non-visual sensory perception. The body is translucent and scaleless. This allows its bright red liver to be easily seen externally, as well as large yellow eggs inside the body cavity when gravid. Gitchak is particularly unusual among cobitids in the absence of skull roof bones at the top of the skull, leaving the brain largely unprotected and covered only by skin.

== Etymology ==
The generic name, Gitchak, is a Garo word meaning 'red', referencing the prominent red appearance of the animal in life. The specific name, nakana, combines the Garo words na·tok, meaning 'fish', and kana, meaning 'blind', alluding to the species' lack of eyes.

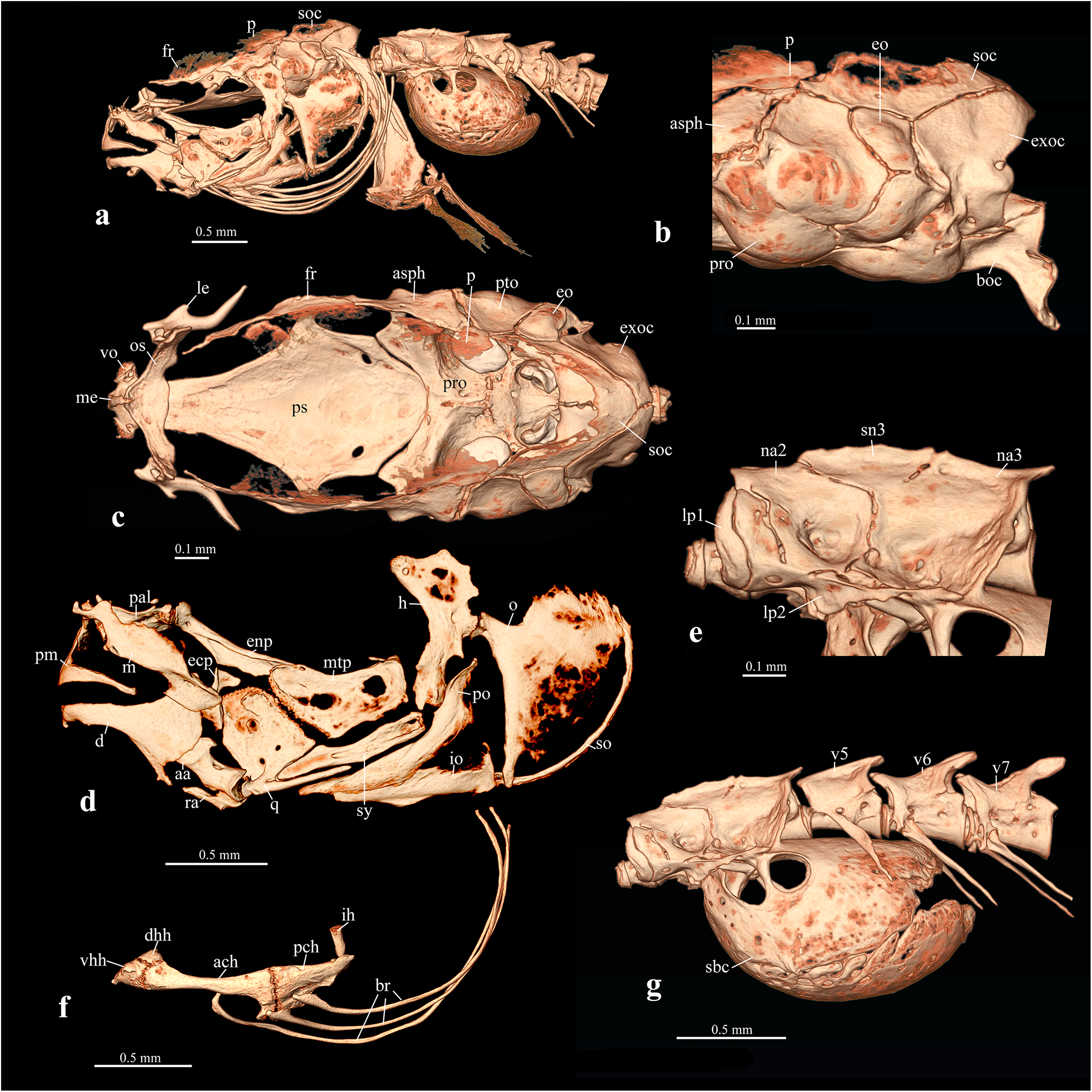
μCT rendering of the skull and first few vertebrae

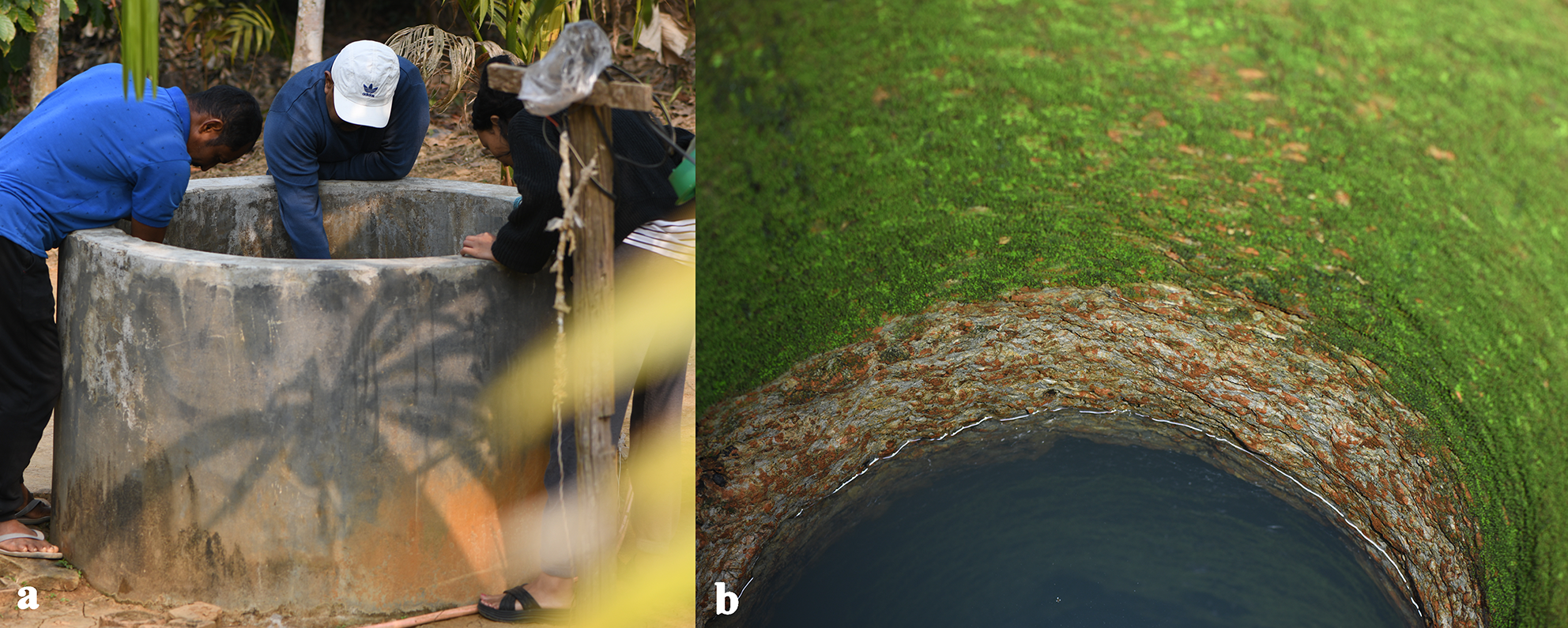
Well from which G. nakana is known
