= Bibarba wenliuensis =

Conservation status
- Data Deficient (IUCN 3.1)

Scientific classification
- Kingdom: Animalia
- Phylum: Chordata
- Class: Actinopterygii
- Order: Cypriniformes
- Family: Cobitidae
- Genus: Bibarba
- Species: B. wenliuensis

Binomial name
- Bibarba wenliuensis Yang, Chen & Li, 2020

Species of ray-finned fish

Bibarba wenliuensis is a species of loach in the genus Bibarba. It was formally described in 2020, and is only known from one location in the Yunnan Province of China.
