= Theriodes =

Conservation status
- Near Threatened (IUCN 3.1)

Scientific classification
- Kingdom: Animalia
- Phylum: Chordata
- Class: Actinopterygii
- Order: Cypriniformes
- Family: Cobitidae
- Genus: Theriodes; Kottelat, 2012
- Species: T. sandakanensis

Binomial name
- Theriodes sandakanensis (Inger & P. K. Chin, 1962)

Synonyms
- Acanthophthalmus sandakanensis Inger & Chin, 1962

Species of fish

Theriodes sandakanensis is a species of loach found only in northern Borneo. This species grows to a length of 4.4 centimetres (1.7 in) TL. This species is the only known member of its genus.
