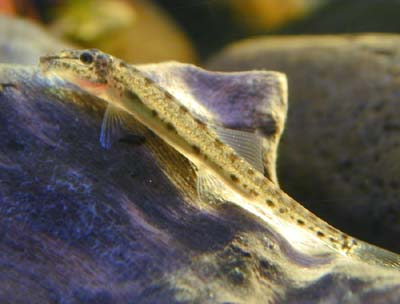
- Acantopsis rungthipae

Scientific classification
- Kingdom: Animalia
- Phylum: Chordata
- Class: Actinopterygii
- Division: Teleostei
- Order: Cypriniformes
- Family: Cobitidae
- Genus: Acantopsis van Hasselt, 1823

Type species
- Acantopsis dialuzona van Hasselt, 1823

Species
- See text

Synonyms
- Prostheacanthus Blyth, 1860

= Acantopsis =

Genus of fishes

Acantopsis is a genus of freshwater fishes, commonly known as horseface loaches or banana-root fishes, in the family Cobitidae. Fishes of the genus Acantopsis inhabit sandy riverbeds throughout Southeast Asia and are most diverse in the Mekong River in Thailand, Laos, and Cambodia wherein five species are known to occur. The common horseface loach, A. rungthipae, is popular in the aquarium trade.

== Species ==
The species in the genus are:

- Acantopsis bruinen Boyd, So, Thach & Page, 2018 (Polkadot horseface loach)
- Acantopsis dialuzona van Hasselt, 1823 (Piglet horseface loach)
- Acantopsis dinema Boyd & Page, 2017 (Peppered horseface loach)
- Acantopsis ioa Boyd & Page, 2017 (Slender horseface loach)
- Acantopsis octoactinotos Siebert, 1991 (Dwarf horseface loach)
- Acantopsis rungthipae Boyd, Nithirojpakdee & Page, 2017 (Common horseface loach)
- Acantopsis spectabilis (Blyth, 1860) (Spectacular horseface loach)
- Acantopsis thiemmedhi Sontirat, 1999 (Blackspotted horseface loach)

Synonyms

- Acantopsis choirorhynchos (Bleeker, 1854) is considered a synonym of A. dialuzona
- Acantopsis multistigmatus Vishwanath & Laisram, 2005 is considered a synonym of A. spectabilis
