= Neoeucirrhichthys =

Conservation status
- Least Concern (IUCN 3.1)

Scientific classification
- Kingdom: Animalia
- Phylum: Chordata
- Class: Actinopterygii
- Order: Cypriniformes
- Family: Cobitidae
- Genus: Neoeucirrhichthys; Bănărescu & Nalbant, 1968
- Species: N. maydelli

Binomial name
- Neoeucirrhichthys maydelli Bănărescu & Nalbant, 1968

Species of fish

Neoeucirrhichthys maydelli, the Goalpara loach, is a species of loach found in Assam, India, and possibly in Bangladesh. It is the only member of its genus.
