= Quintabarbates =

Scientific classification
- Kingdom: Animalia
- Phylum: Chordata
- Class: Actinopterygii
- Order: Cypriniformes
- Family: Cobitidae
- Genus: Quintabarbates; T. R. Roberts, 2022
- Species: Q. bicolor

Binomial name
- Quintabarbates bicolor T. R. Roberts, 2022

Genus of fishes

Quintabarbates is a monospecific genus of freshwater ray-finned fish belonging to the family Cobitidae, the true or spiny loaches. The only species in the genus is Quintabarbates bicolor which was first formally described in 2022 by the American ichthyologist Tyson R. Roberts. This taxon is only known from a tributary of the Chindwin River in the Irrawaddy River in Myanmar. The genus name, Quintabarbates, means "five beards", and is a reference to the five pairs of barbels. The specific name, bicolor, means "two colours", an allusion to the thick horizontal stripes of iridescent vermillion green above and below a stripe of iridescent orange on the upper body.
