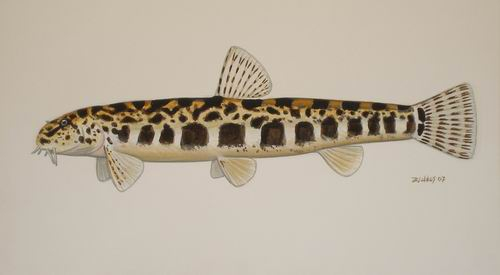
- Sabanejewia aurata

Scientific classification
- Domain: Eukaryota
- Kingdom: Animalia
- Phylum: Chordata
- Class: Actinopterygii
- Order: Cypriniformes
- Family: Cobitidae
- Genus: Sabanejewia; Vladykov, 1929

Type species
- Cobitis balcanica S. L. Karaman, 1922

Synonyms
- Andrzewia Vasil'eva, Solovyeva & Vasil'ev 2022

= Golden loach =

Genus of fishes

The golden loaches (Sabanejewia) are a genus of ray-finned fish in the family Cobitidae.

== Species ==
There are currently 12 recognized species in this genus:

- Sabanejewia aralensis (Kessler, 1877) (Aral spined loach)
- Sabanejewia aurata (De Filippi, 1863) (golden spined loach)
- Sabanejewia balcanica (S. L. Karaman, 1922) (Balkan golden loach)
- Sabanejewia baltica Witkowski, 1994 (Northern golden loach)
- Sabanejewia bulgarica (Drensky, 1928)
- Sabanejewia caspia (Eichwald, 1838) (Caspian spined loach)
- Sabanejewia caucasica (L. S. Berg, 1906) (Ciscaucasian spined loach)
- Sabanejewia kubanica Vasil'eva & Vasil'ev, 1988
- Sabanejewia larvata (De Filippi, 1859) (Italian loach)
- Sabanejewia maeotica Vasil'eva & Vasil'ev, 2023 (Azov golden loach)
- Sabanejewia romanica (Băcescu, 1943) (Romanian loach)
- Sabanejewia vallachica (Nalbant, 1957) (Eastern Carpathian golden loach)
