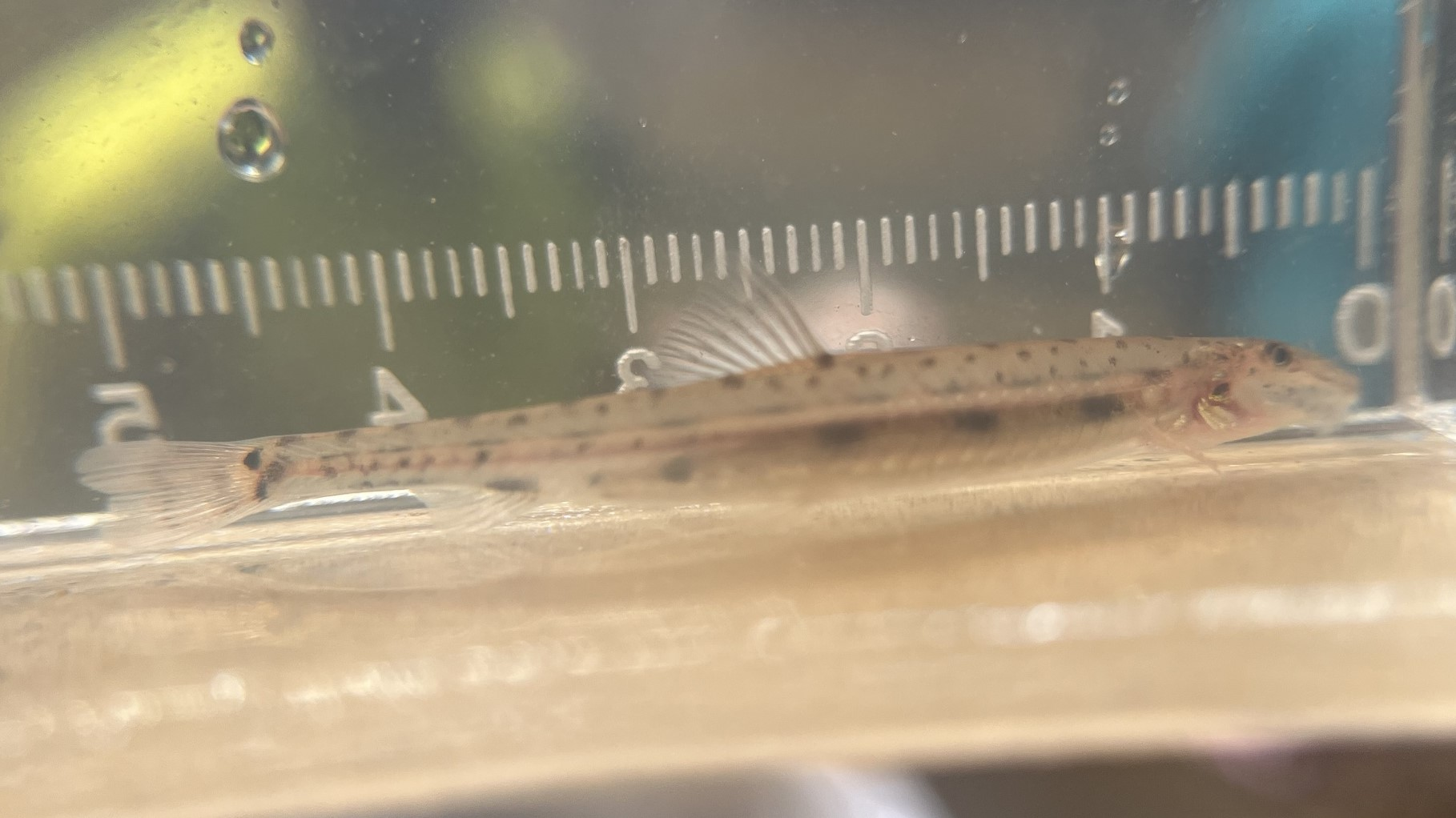
- Acanthopsoides molobrion

Scientific classification
- Kingdom: Animalia
- Phylum: Chordata
- Class: Actinopterygii
- Division: Teleostei
- Order: Cypriniformes
- Family: Cobitidae
- Genus: Acanthopsoides; Fowler, 1934

Type species
- Acanthopsoides gracilis Fowler, 1934

Synonyms
- Aperioptus Richardson, 1848; Neacanthopsis Smith, 1945

= Acanthopsoides =

Genus of fishes

Acanthopsoides is a genus of freshwater ray-finned-fishes belonging to the family Cobitidae, the true or spined loaches. These small fishes are found in Asia.

== Taxonomy ==
Acanthopsoides was first formally proposed as a monospecific genus in 1934 by the American zoologist Henry Weed Fowler with Acanthopsoides gracilis as its only species, as well as being designated as its type species. The type locality for A. gracilis was given as Chiang Mai in the Chao Phraya River basin of Thailand. This taxon was thought to be a synonym of Aperioptus, a genus proposed by Sir John Richardson in 1848 for Aperioptus pictorius, however, the specimens Richardson used to describe the genus were lost. In 2015 a neotype of Aperioptus pictorius was designated, but this designation was considered invalid and the next available name, Acanthopsoides, was put forward. This genus is included in the family Cobitidae, the true or spined loaches, in the suborder Cobitoidei of the order Cypriniformes.

== Species ==
Acanthopsoides has the following species classified within it:

- Acanthopsoides delphax Siebert, 1991
- Acanthopsoides gracilentus (Smith, 1945)
- Acanthopsoides gracilis Fowler, 1934
- Acanthopsoides hapalias Siebert, 1991
- Acanthopsoides molobrion Siebert, 1991
- Acanthopsoides robertsi Siebert, 1991
