= Paralepidocephalus =

Scientific classification
- Kingdom: Animalia
- Phylum: Chordata
- Class: Actinopterygii
- Order: Cypriniformes
- Family: Cobitidae
- Genus: Paralepidocephalus; T. L. Tchang, 1935

Type species
- Paralepidocephalus yui T. L. Tchang, 1935

Genus of fishes

Paralepidocephalus is a genus of loach endemic to Yunnan, China.

== Species ==
There are currently two recognized species in this genus:

- Paralepidocephalus translucens S. W. Liu, J. X. Yang & X. Y. Chen, 2016
- Paralepidocephalus yui T. L. Tchang, 1935
