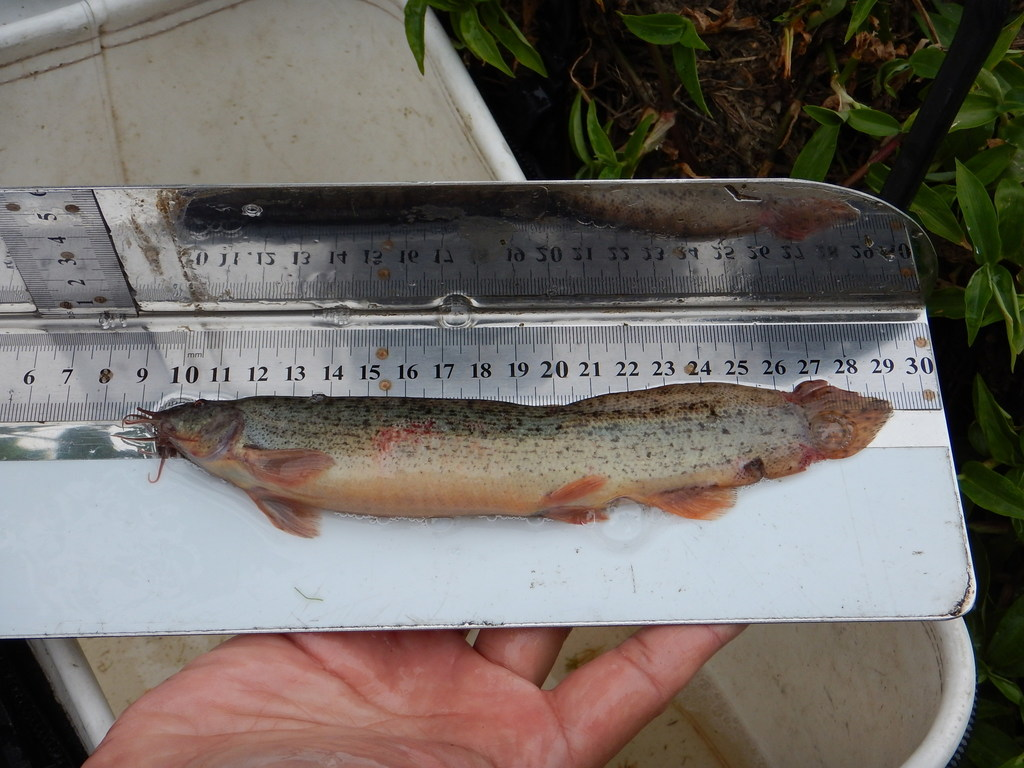

Conservation status
- Least Concern (IUCN 3.1)

Scientific classification
- Kingdom: Animalia
- Phylum: Chordata
- Class: Actinopterygii
- Order: Cypriniformes
- Family: Cobitidae
- Genus: Misgurnus
- Species: M. dabryanus

Binomial name
- Misgurnus dabryanus (Guichenot, 1872)

Synonyms
- Paramisgurnus dabryanus Guichenot, 1872; Misgurnus mizolepis Günther, 1888; Misgurnus oligolepos Chen, Shen & Li, 1994

= Misgurnus dabryanus =

Species of fish

Misgurnus dabryanus, the large-scale loach is a species of true loach that is native to Mainland China, Hainan, Taiwan, Korea, and the Russian Far East. It can be found in water bodies such as the Yangtze Basin, Pearl River, Amur River, and various other drainages. There are several known invasive populations in places such as Barcelona, the San Joaquin River in California, and the majority of Japan. The large-scale loach is typically brown, grey, or golden in color with mottled or speckled black dots, which leads to it sometimes called a "peppered loach" when sold at pet stores (though it is more often misidentified as the pond loach instead). It is a small loach, growing between 7.3 to 15.4 cm (2.9 to 6.1 in) TL.

The diet and behaviors of the large-scaled loach are just about the same as other true loaches. This loach is an omnivorous scavenging bottom feeder, and is equipped with three pairs of barbels used to detect edible items. They are able to breathe atmospheric oxygen, which allows it to survive in poor quality water or even on land for extended periods of time. Females develop eggs over the winter and reproduction occurs during the spring. The male wraps around the female in order to fertilize the eggs, which are laid in cover such as aquatic vegetation with no further parental care provided. The large-scale loach looks very similar to another species of true loach, the pond loach (Misgurnus anguillicaudatus), so it is possible that invasive populations of the pond loach might actually consist either partially or entirely of large-scale loaches. The large-scale loach can be told apart from the pond loach by the presence of higher adipose crests on the caudal peduncle, a thinner lamina circularis (enlarged bony scale at the base of the first and second pectoral fin ray), and the lack of a dark spot near the caudal base in the upper corner on the tail fin. The large-scale loach also grows to a smaller size than the pond loach, which reaches 30 cm (12 in) TL. Both species are able to hybridize together, so identification may be difficult in mixed populations.
