= Kottelatlimia =

Scientific classification
- Domain: Eukaryota
- Kingdom: Animalia
- Phylum: Chordata
- Class: Actinopterygii
- Order: Cypriniformes
- Family: Cobitidae
- Genus: Kottelatlimia; Nalbant, 1994

Type species
- Lepidocephalichthys katik Kottelat & K. K. P. Lim, 1992

Genus of fishes

Kottelatlimia is a genus of loaches found in Southeast Asia.

== Species ==
There are currently three recognized species in this genus:

- Kottelatlimia hipporhynchos Kottelat & H. H. Tan, 2008
- Kottelatlimia katik (Kottelat & K. K. P. Lim, 1992)
- Kottelatlimia pristes (T. R. Roberts, 1989)
