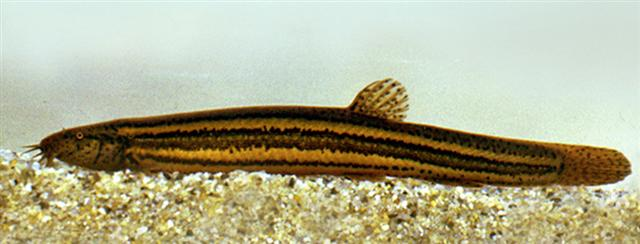
- Misgurnus fossilis

Scientific classification
- Kingdom: Animalia
- Phylum: Chordata
- Class: Actinopterygii
- Division: Teleostei
- Order: Cypriniformes
- Family: Cobitidae
- Genus: Misgurnus; Lacépède, 1803

Type species
- Cobitis fossilis Linnaeus, 1758

Synonyms
- Mesomisgurnus P.-W. Fang, 1935; Paramisgurnus Guichenot, 1872; Paramisgurnus Sauvage, 1878; Ussuria Nikolskii, 1904

= Misgurnus =

Genus of fishes

Misgurnus is a genus of true loaches found in Europe and Asia. The origin of the name Misgurnus comes from the Greek word miseo (to hate) and the Turkish gür (loud), a name given to them due to their habit of becoming very active during barometric pressure changes that occur during thunderstorms. The common names, weather loach or weatherfish, also derive from this behavior. Some species of Misgurnus are eaten, mostly in Asia, and are also sold as pets in the aquarium trade. Their average size can range from 6 inches (150 mm) to over 12 inches (300 mm).

== Species ==
There are currently 13 recognized species in this genus:

- Misgurnus amamianus Nakajima & Hashiguchi, 2022
- Misgurnus anguillicaudatus (Cantor, 1842) (pond loach, oriental weatherfish, dojo loach)
- Misgurnus bipartitus (Sauvage & Dabry de Thiersant, 1874)
- Misgurnus buphoensis R. T. Kim & S. Y. Park, 1995
- Misgurnus chipisaniensis Shedko & Vasil'eva, 2022
- Misgurnus dabryanus (Guichenot, 1872)
- Misgurnus fossilis (Linnaeus, 1758) (weatherfish)
- Misgurnus mohoity (Dybowski, 1869)
- Misgurnus multimaculatus Rendahl (de), 1944
- Misgurnus nahangensis (Nguyen & Bui, 2009)
- Misgurnus nikolskyi Vasil'eva, 2001
- Misgurnus psammismus (Richardson, 1846)
- Misgurnus tonkinensis Rendahl, 1937

== See also ==
- Paramisgurnus dabryanus, a closely related species
- Cobitis taenia, sometimes called "spotted weather loach"
