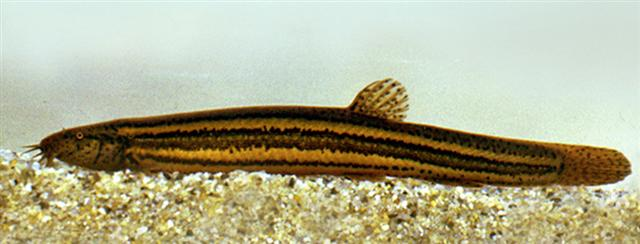

Conservation status
- Least Concern (IUCN 3.1)

Scientific classification
- Kingdom: Animalia
- Phylum: Chordata
- Class: Actinopterygii
- Division: Teleostei
- Order: Cypriniformes
- Family: Cobitidae
- Genus: Misgurnus
- Species: M. fossilis

Binomial name
- Misgurnus fossilis (Linnaeus, 1758)

Synonyms
- Cobitis fossilis Linnaeus, 1758; Petromizon variegatus Wulff, 1765

= Misgurnus fossilis =

Species of fish

The weatherfish (Misgurnus fossilis) is a species of true loach that has a wide range in Europe and some parts of Asia. It is an omnivorous scavenger bottom feeder, using its sensitive barbels to find edible items. The diet mostly consists of small aquatic invertebrates along with some detritus. The weatherfish is long and thin which allows it to burrow through the substrate and navigate through places that deeper bodied fish would have trouble with. It grows up to 30 cm (12 in) in total length, though there are fishermen who say they have caught longer, up to 45 cm (17.7 in). If true, this would make Misgurnus fossilis the largest species of true loach.

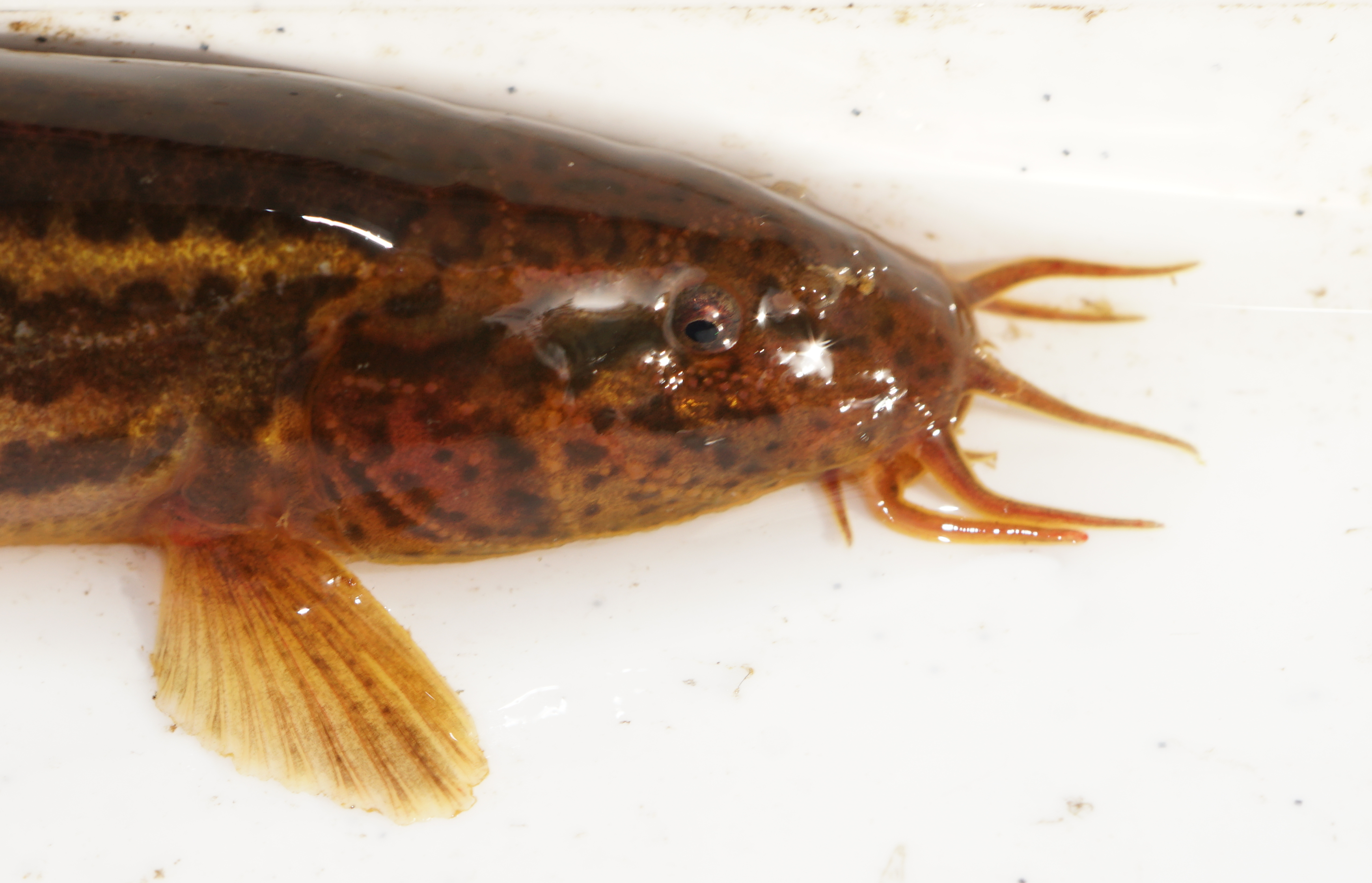
The weatherfish has 6 barbels at the upper and 4 smaller ones at the lower jaw

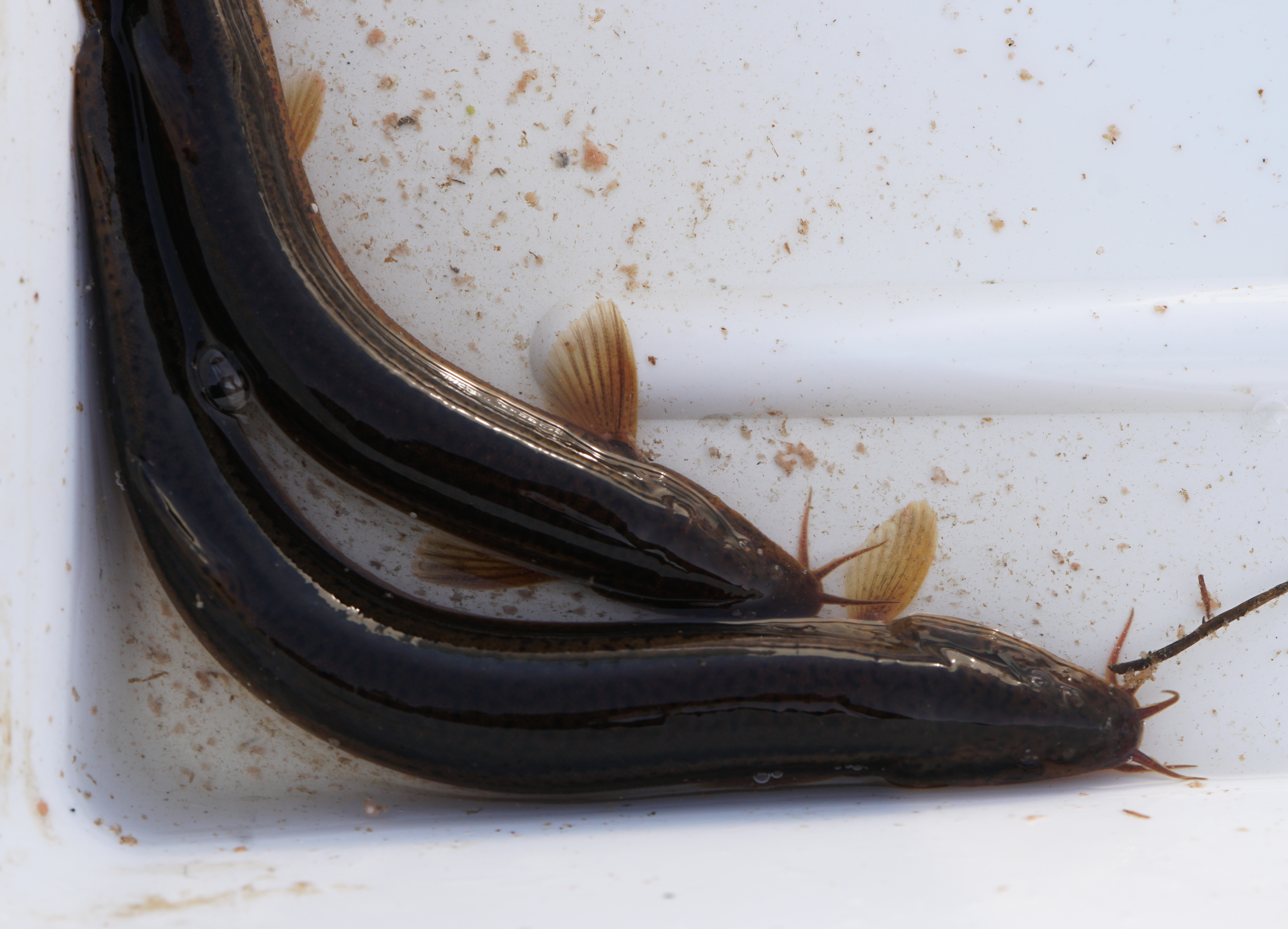
The male weatherfish (top) typically has bigger pectoral fins

This loach has a very wide range, especially in Europe. It occurs north of the Alps, from the Meuse River in western Europe all the way to the Neva River in northwestern Russia. It also occurs in the northern part of the Black Sea basin from the Danube River to the Kuban River, and in the Caspian Sea in the River Volga and River Ural drainages. It is also introduced in a few different areas, but not to the extent of the pond loach (Misgurnus anguillicaudatus).

Adult weatherfish live in dense patches of aquatic vegetation while juveniles prefer to live near the shoreline in very shallow water where there is a lot of detritus; neither adults nor juveniles are found in open areas without vegetation. Because of their habitat preferences, dredging and aquatic weed removal poses a danger to weatherfish populations. The weatherfish is listed as least concern but is protected in most of its range. They are able to survive in habitats that many other fish would be unable to because of their ability to breathe atmospheric oxygen. In low oxygen conditions, the weatherfish will swim to the surface and gulp air. The air then goes through the intestines where a complex system of blood vessels extracts the oxygen, before expelling the air from the anus.
