= Koreocobitis =

Scientific classification
- Kingdom: Animalia
- Phylum: Chordata
- Class: Actinopterygii
- Order: Cypriniformes
- Family: Cobitidae
- Genus: Koreocobitis; I. S. Kim, J. Y. Park & Nalbant, 1997

Type species
- Cobitis rotundicaudata Wakiya & T. Mori, 1929

Genus of fishes

Koreocobitis is a small genus of loaches endemic to the Korean Peninsula.

== Species ==
There are currently two recognized species in this genus:

- Koreocobitis naktongensis I. S. Kim, J. Y. Park & Nalbant, 2000
- Koreocobitis rotundicaudata (Wakiya & T. Mori, 1929) (White nose loach)
