= Bibarba =

Scientific classification
- Kingdom: Animalia
- Phylum: Chordata
- Class: Actinopterygii
- Order: Cypriniformes
- Family: Cobitidae
- Genus: Bibarba; Y. X. Chen & Y. F. Chen, 2007

Type species
- Bibarba bibarba Chen & Chen, 2007

Genus of fishes

Bibarba is a genus of loach that is found in the Chengjiang River and Hongshuihe River in China.

== Species ==
There are currently 2 recognized species in this genus:

- Bibarba bibarba Y. X. Chen & Y. F. Chen, 2007
- Bibarba parvoculus T. J. Wu, Jian Yang & L. H. Xiu, 2015
- Bibarba wenliuensis Yang, Chen & Li, 2020
