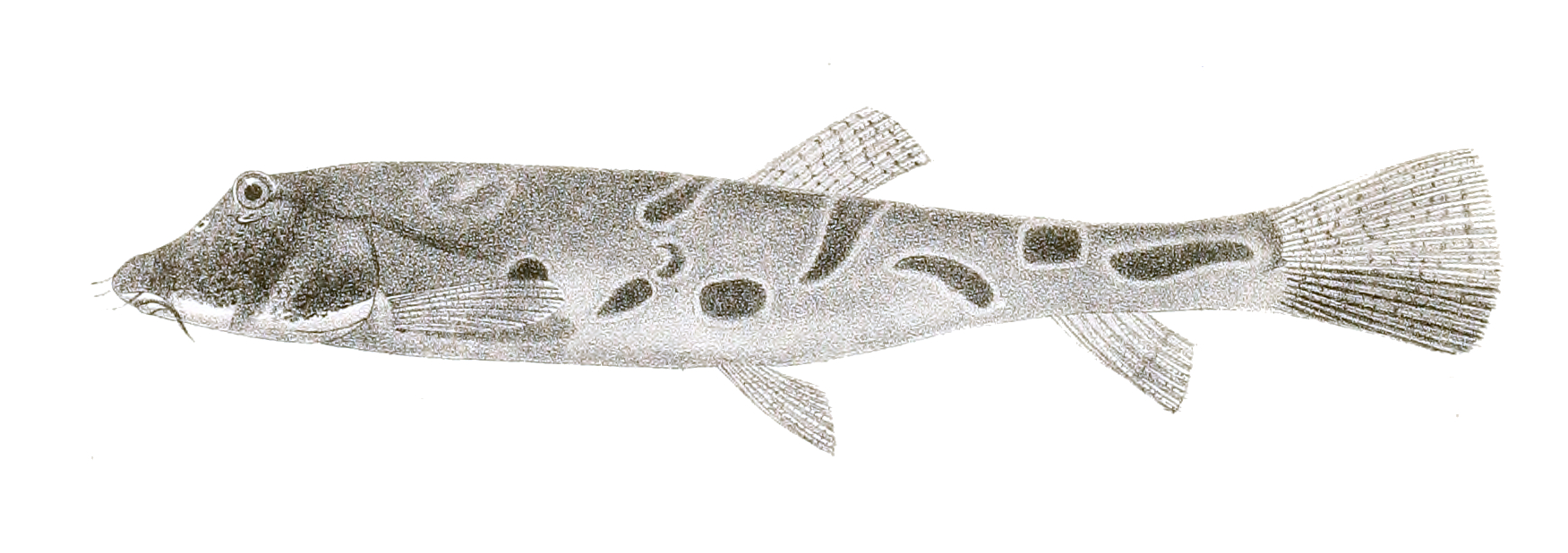
- Gongota loach

Conservation status
- Least Concern (IUCN 3.1)

Scientific classification
- Kingdom: Animalia
- Phylum: Chordata
- Class: Actinopterygii
- Division: Teleostei
- Order: Cypriniformes
- Family: Cobitidae
- Genus: Canthophrys; Swainson, 1838
- Species: C. gongota

Binomial name
- Canthophrys gongota (F. Hamilton, 1822)

Synonyms
- Cobitis gongota Hamilton, 1822

= Canthophrys =

Genus of fishes

Canthophrys is a genus of freshwater fish in the loach family, Cobitidae. It contains the sole species Canthophrys gongota, the gongota loach, which is found in South Asia.
