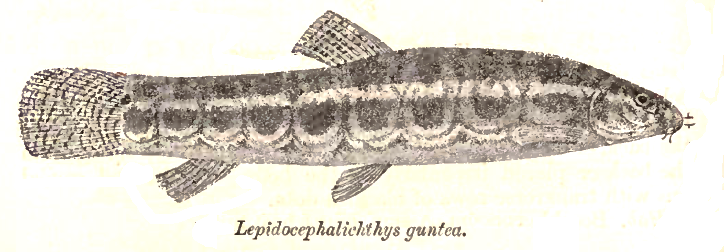
- Lepidocephalichthys guntea

Scientific classification
- Kingdom: Animalia
- Phylum: Chordata
- Class: Actinopterygii
- Division: Teleostei
- Order: Cypriniformes
- Family: Cobitidae
- Genus: Lepidocephalichthys; Bleeker, 1863

Type species
- Cobitis hasselti Valenciennes, 1846

Species
- See text

Synonyms
- Cobitichthys Bleeker, 1858; Enobarbichthys Whitley, 1931; Enobarbus Whitley, 1928; Jerdonia Day, 1871; Madrasia Nalbant, 1963; Platacanthus Day, 1865

= Lepidocephalichthys =

Genus of fishes

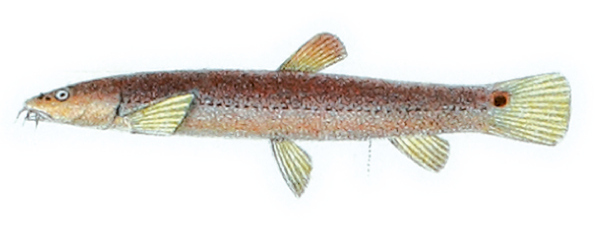
Lepidocephalichthys barbatuloides

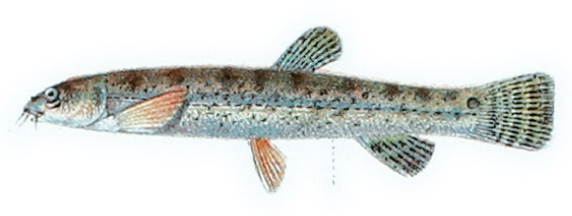
Lepidocephalichthys hasselti

Lepidocephalichthys is a genus of ray-finned fish in the family Cobitidae.

== Species ==
There are currently 20 recognized species in this genus:

- Lepidocephalichthys alkaia Havird & Page, 2010
- Lepidocephalichthys annandalei B. L. Chaudhuri, 1912 (Annandale loach)
- Lepidocephalichthys arunachalensis (A. K. Datta & Barman, 1984)
- Lepidocephalichthys balios Kottelat, 2024
- Lepidocephalichthys barbatuloides (Bleeker, 1851) incertae sedis
- Lepidocephalichthys berdmorei (Blyth, 1860) (Burmese loach)
- Lepidocephalichthys coromandelensis (Menon, 1992)
- Lepidocephalichthys eleios Kottelat, 2017
- Lepidocephalichthys furcatus (de Beaufort, 1933)
- Lepidocephalichthys goalparensis Pillai & Yazdani, 1976
- Lepidocephalichthys guntea (F. Hamilton, 1822) (Guntea loach)
- Lepidocephalichthys hasselti (Valenciennes, 1846)
- Lepidocephalichthys irrorata Hora, 1921 (Loktak loach)
- Lepidocephalichthys jonklaasi (Deraniyagala, 1956) (Jonklaas's loach)
- Lepidocephalichthys kranos Havird & Page, 2010
- Lepidocephalichthys longipinnis (Menon, 1992)
- Lepidocephalichthys lorentzi (M. C. W. Weber & de Beaufort, 1916)
- Lepidocephalichthys micropogon (Blyth, 1860)
- Lepidocephalichthys thermalis (Valenciennes, 1846) (Common spiny loach)
- Lepidocephalichthys tomaculum Kottelat & K. K. P. Lim, 1992
- Lepidocephalichthys zeppelini Havird & Tangjitjaroen, 2010
