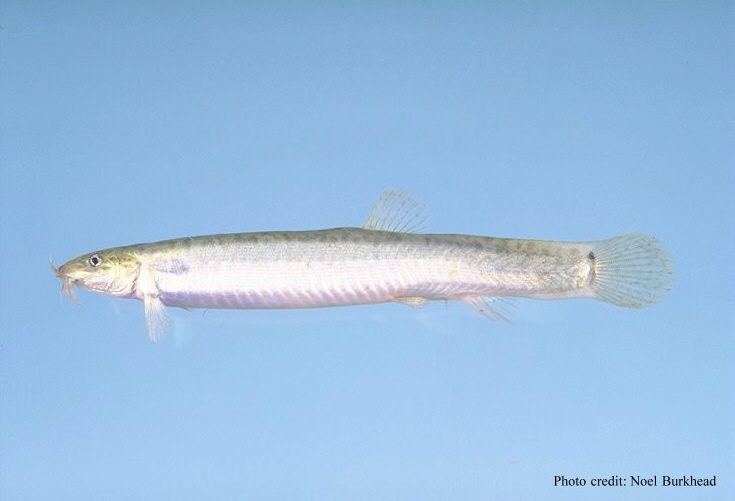

Conservation status
- Least Concern (IUCN 3.1)

Scientific classification
- Kingdom: Animalia
- Phylum: Chordata
- Class: Actinopterygii
- Division: Teleostei
- Order: Cypriniformes
- Family: Cobitidae
- Genus: Misgurnus
- Species: M. anguillicaudatus

Binomial name
- Misgurnus anguillicaudatus (Cantor, 1842)

Synonyms
- Cobitis anguillicaudata Cantor, 1842; Misgurnus lividus (Sauvage & Dabry de Thiersant, 1874); Nemacheilus lividus Sauvage & Dabry de Thiersant, 1874; Misgurnus crossochilus Sauvage, 1878; Ussuria leptocephala Nikolskii, 1903; Misgurnus punctatus Oshima, 1926; Misgurnus elongatus Kimura, 1934

= Pond loach =

Species of freshwater fish

The pond loach (Misgurnus anguillicaudatus), also known as the Dojo loach, oriental weatherloach, or oriental weatherfish, is a freshwater fish in the loach family Cobitidae. They are native to East Asia, but are also popular as an aquarium fish and introduced elsewhere in Asia and to Europe, America and Australia. The alternate name weather loach is shared with several other Cobitidae, including the other members of the genus Misgurnus and the spotted weather loach (Cobitis taenia, commonly known as spined loach). This term comes from their ability to detect changes in barometric pressure before a storm and react with frantic swimming or standing on end.

== Description ==
Pond loaches usually range from 10 to 20 cm (3.9 to 7.9 in) in length, although individuals can reach 28 cm (11 in) in standard length; females are generally larger than males.They also come in a variety of colors, such as pink, orange, albino and gray, and can vary in colour from yellow to olive green, to a common light brown or grey with lighter undersides. Like many other loaches, pond loaches have slender, eel-like body. The mouth of the loach is surrounded by three sets of barbels, which are used to sift through silt or pebbles to find food, and also to dig under gravel and sand to conceal the fish out of nervousness or self-defence, unlike the other loaches who use the spines beneath the eyes.

Pond loaches are bottom-dwelling omnivores whose diet consists largely of small benthic invertebrates and detritus. Stomach-content studies have found aquatic insect larvae, small crustaceans, mollusks, and other invertebrates among their major food items.

Pond loaches are very hardy fish that can live in poor-quality water, and can survive short periods of drought by producing a layer of moisture-trapping mucus to keep themselves damp. Despite their resiliance against water conditions, pond loaches should still be kept in pristine water to ensure their health and prosperity within the home aquarium or pond. These loaches prefer a soft, sandy, smooth stone, fine gravel substrate, or bare bottomed tank as opposed to any form of rocks or rough gravel, which have been known to damage the sensitive barbels and skin.

== Physiology ==
Unlike most other fishes, the pond loach can burrow into and hide in soft substrates, breathe atmospheric air through enteral respiration if necessary, and survive for long periods of time outside of the water. For the pond loach to survive on land for extended periods of time, it has physiological adaptations to reduce toxic ammonia concentrations in the body and maintain homeostasis and normal functioning of tissues. When on land, the pond loach can suppress protein breakdown and catabolism (which avoids creating ammonia), switch to partial amino catabolism (which creates non-toxic alanine instead of ammonia), convert ammonia to non-toxic glutamine, and get rid of ammonia by excreting it as NH3 gas. The pond loach is also relatively insensitive to ammonia, though it is not known how pond loach tissues, especially the heart and brain, are able to function at ammonia concentrations that would be lethal for other species. One hypothesis is that the pond loach may maintain normal brain cell functioning by altering the sensitivity and specificity of receptors in the brain for potassium ions, which otherwise would be overwhelmed by ammonia.

== Clonal reproduction ==
The pond loach can reproduce sexually and asexually. Although sexually reproducing diploids (2n = 50) are most common in Japan, asexual clones also occur in a few wild populations. Clonally reproducing diploid loaches produce unreduced diploid eggs that develop into identical clones (without any genetic contribution from sperm) by the process of gynogenesis. During gynogenesis, an egg is activated by a sperm that degenerates without fusing with the egg nucleus, so that the resulting embryo contains only maternal chromosomes. This asexual process involves the duplication of chromosomes by mitosis without cytokinesis prior to meiosis, i.e. premeiotic endomitosis, followed by a quasi-normal meiosis to produce diploid eggs.

== In the aquarium ==
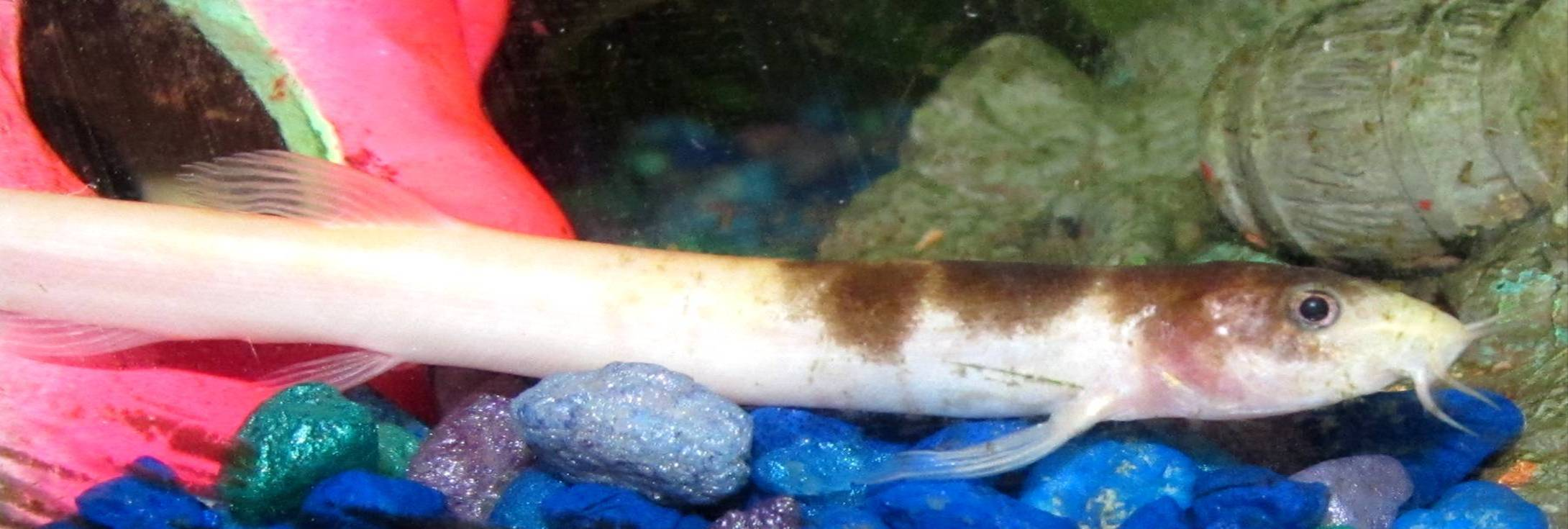

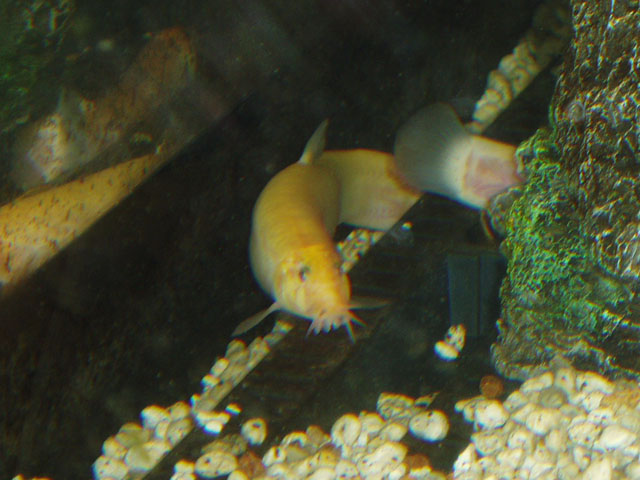

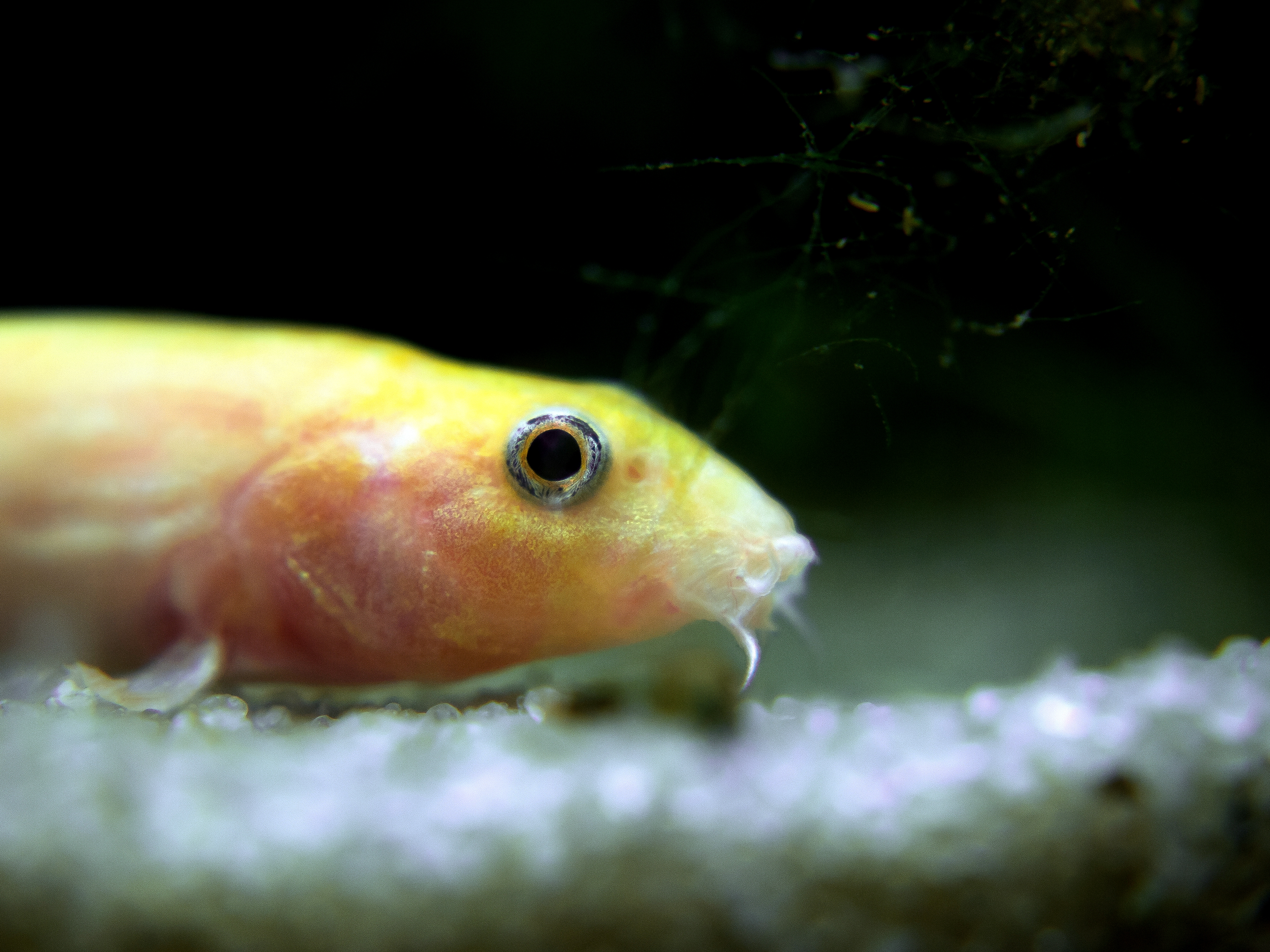

Pond loaches are quite active, athletic swimmers, with their activity levels, allegedly, being influenced by oncoming storms or changes in barometric pressure (hence the name "weather" loach). They are generally active throughout the day, only resting intermittently, but become notably crepuscular and nocturnal as the day progresses, foraging and swimming more actively in the hours between sunset and sunrise. For this reason, many aquarists and keepers will adjust their fishes' communal feeding time to be in the evening, an important point to consider if cohabitating pond loaches with other species. When not resting out-of-sight, pond loaches can often be seen lying on the surfaces of larger-leaved plants (such as Anubias, Echinodorus or Nymphaea sp.), on driftwood, or on smooth rocks, and often in comedic or ridiculous positions. They may even appear lifeless, lying on their sides or back, before suddenly springing back to "life" and continuing with their routine behavior. This "playing-dead" style of rest is also well known from other related species, like the clown loach (Chromobotia macracanthus).

The pond loach is an exceptionally peaceful, hardy species, capable of withstanding unheated aquariums, and preferring to live in outdoor ponds. Not being a tropical species by nature, water temperatures above 70 to 75 °F (21 to 24 °C) are not recommended for, and can cause respiratory issues, fatigue, and even death, in pond loaches. For this reason they make a viable companion species for goldfish, which also are a cold-water species. They show virtually no aggression or hostility to any other tankmates, including their own kind, mostly minding their own business despite being a highly sociable species; if housing multiple individuals, which is usually recommended, pond loaches will often "cuddle" and rest huddled-together. The species is widely sold at pet stores and local fish shops. Given their somewhat "goofy" and cantankerous nature, they are not particularly aloof or shy, and thus can develop a "friendliness" towards their caretakers, swimming around their owner's hands and arms, allowing for physical contact and even hand-feeding.

The larger a pond loach matures, the more muscular and likely to breach the water's surface they become; due to their jumping prowess, the average aquarium cover should be secured with tape or additional sheets of acrylic or plastic, or panes of additional glass. If kept outside, proper netting over the water feature may be required. If a pond loach successfully jumps from the water (and is not subsequently caught by a bird or other animal), it may crawl on the ground for some time, breathing atmospheric oxygen, before eventually suffocating. Despite their ability to move terrestrially between shallow bodies of water in the wild, something many species do (like killifish), they do not have the same respiratory adaptations as, for example, the lungfishes or mudskippers. Also, in an indoor aquarium setting, care must be taken to cover any tubing or pipes that are large enough for a loach to fit inside of, as they may even travel up filtration tubes and become stuck in the filter itself. Pond loaches enjoy digging and burrowing themselves in the substrate of their tank, so make sure that your substrate is fine enough for them to dig in. If you keep live plants in your tank, they will be uprooted by the loaches, so it is a good idea to weight your plants. The pond loach is also peculiar in that it will sometimes bury itself in the substrate during times of stress. This often surprises new owners, as the fish will "disappear" shortly after introduction to the tank only to "reappear" later.

Because of their alleged appetite for snails, these loaches are commonly perceived as helping to alleviate snail infestations in fish tanks; however, due to their sensitive barbels, and substrate-sifting method of foraging for buried worms and hidden brine shrimp, pond loaches are not nearly as effective against mollusks as the related botiid loaches. Botias possess notably different, downward-pointing snouts with visibly fewer barbels, as they are more active hunters of prey than the bottom-dwelling pond loaches. The botias have evolved perfectly shaped snouts to fit inside a snail's shell.

The pond loaches prefer a water pH of 6.5–8.0, but, as a temperate-climate freshwater species, will tolerate far more acidic conditions, even for extended amounts of time, with little negative reactions. This makes the pond loach a common choice for first-time aquariums, due to their hardiness. This fish should be kept in groups of at least three, as they like to be in physical contact with each other and feel each other with their barbels when they rest.

There are some hybrid varieties bred in captivity, like the golden dojo and the peppered strain (not to be confused with the peppered loach). Sometimes the pond loach (especially the golden variety) is mistaken for the kuhli loach. The kuhli, however, likes warm tropical temperatures, will tolerate more acidic conditions, and matures at a much smaller four inches (10 cm). Although these two species have numerous differentiating traits, individual kuhli and pond loaches may resemble each other while young and at the usual age and size of what most fish stores market.

== As food ==
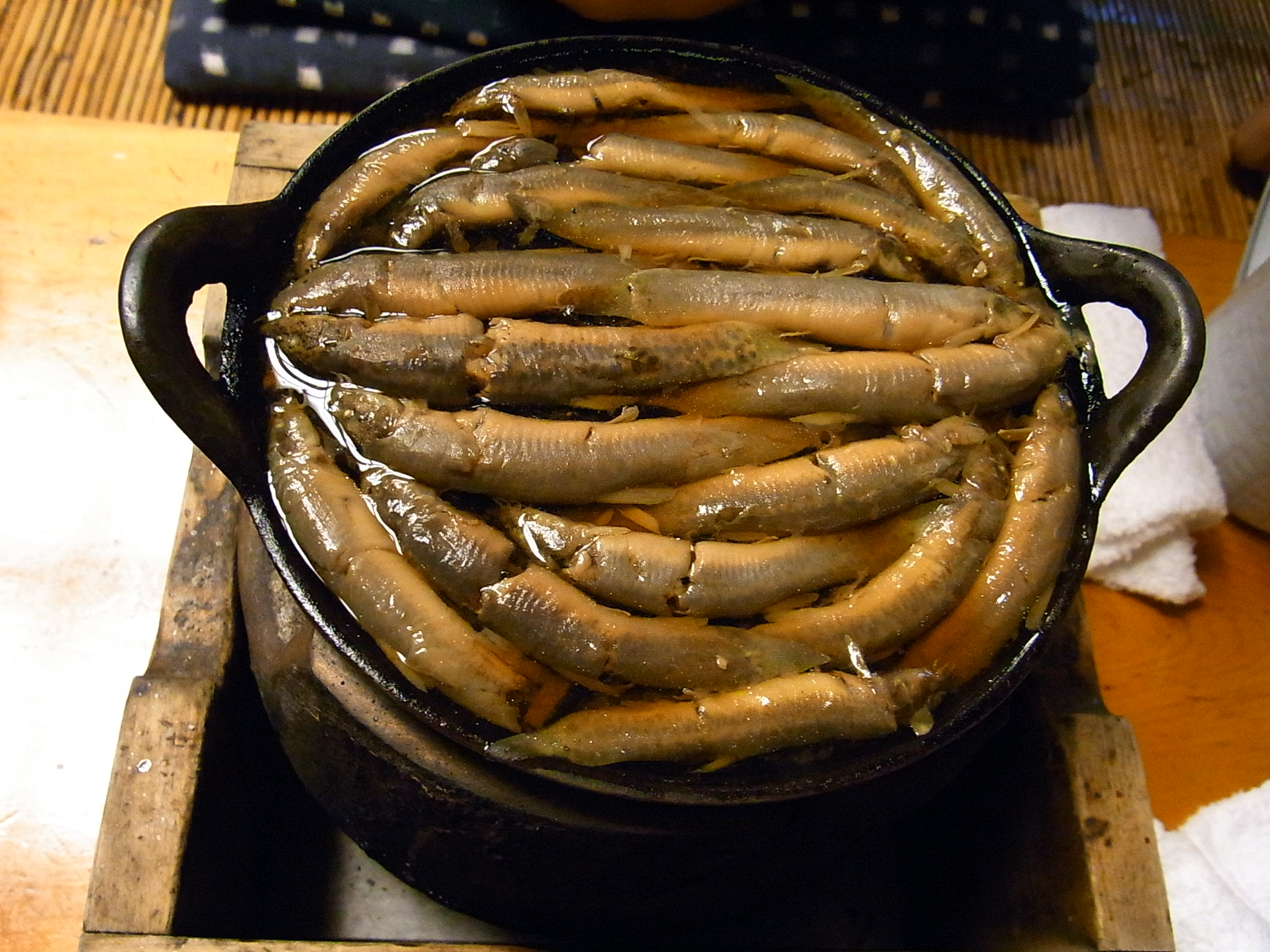
Dojō nabe, Japanese loach hot pot

The pond loach is a common culinary fish in East Asia, raised on a large scale in fish farming. According to FAO, M. anguillicaudatus was 30th on the list of most important species in aquaculture, in terms of total weight produced in 2018, but by individual number it is the most farmed fish in the world.

In Korea, chueo-tang (loach soup) is made with pond loach. The Japanese hotpot dojō nabe, a specialty of Asakusa, is also made with this.

In China, pond loach is consumed, especially in Sichuan province, and known as niqiu.

== Range ==
=== Native range ===
According to the US Geological Survey, M. anguillicaudatus is native to eastern Asia from Siberia to Northern Vietnam, including Japan.

=== Introduced range ===
==== Australia ====
Imported into Australia in the 1960s as an aquarium species, M. anguillicaudatus was first detected in the wild in 1980, and its further importation was banned in 1986. M. anguillicaudatus is a declared Class 1 noxious species in New South Wales, as it has become established in several NSW rivers, including the Murray River extending downstream into South Australia.

==== United States ====
Between 2010 and 2020 M. anguillicaudatus was found in 10 states of the United States including Alabama and Georgia. The Georgia find was in November 2020 in McNutt Creek in Athens on the border between Clarke and Oconee. This indicates eastern Georgia is environmentally suitable for it, and so if not stopped M. anguillicaudatus is expected to spread through the area. That could include the downstream and adjacent rivers, the Middle Oconee, the North Oconee, the Oconee River itself, the Ocmulgee, and the Altamaha.

As of November 2021, according to the U.S. Geological Survey, this species has also been captured from the wild in Illinois (including many captures in the Chicago area), New York, Ohio, Michigan, Washington, Oregon, Maryland, New Jersey, North Carolina, Louisiana, and southern California.

==== Uzbekistan ====
Misgurnus anguillicaudatus was first recorded in Uzbekistan in 2022, when specimens were collected from rice paddies adjacent to the lower reaches of the Amu Darya River in the northwestern part of the country. Further collections in 2023 confirmed the presence of both mature adults and juveniles, indicating a well-established, reproducing population. The likely invasion pathway is dispersal from the Karakum Canal in neighboring Turkmenistan, where the species had previously been intentionally introduced, via its hydrological connection to the Amu Darya. This represents only the second species of the family Cobitidae recorded from Uzbekistan, joining the native Aral spined loach, Sabanejewia aralensis.

== See also ==
- Loach
- European weather loach
- Dojō nabe

== Bibliography ==
- "Misgurnus anguillicaudatus". Integrated Taxonomic Information System.
- Froese, Rainer; Pauly, Daniel (eds.). "Misgurnus anguillicaudatus". FishBase. October 2005 version.
- How to Keep Your New Weather Loach
- "New Invasive Fish Spreads Through The Ebro Delta". Science News. Science Daily. 2009-01-20.
- Franch, Nati; Clavero, Miguel; Garrido, Montse; Gaya, Norbert; Lopez, Veronica; Pou-Rovira, Quim; Maria Queral, Josep (2008). "On the establishment and range expansion of oriental weatherfish (Misgurnus anguillicaudatus) in NE Iberian Peninsula". Biological Invasions. 10 (8): 1327. Bibcode:2008BiInv..10.1327F. doi:10.1007/s10530-007-9207-9. hdl:10261/46169. S2CID 3236525.
