= Maurice Kottelat =

Swiss ichthyologist

Maurice Kottelat (born 16 July 1957 in Delémont, Switzerland) is a Swiss ichthyologist specializing in Eurasian freshwater fishes.

Kottelat obtained a License in Sciences at the University of Neuchâtel in 1987 and in 1989 a doctoral degree from the University of Amsterdam. In 1980 he went to Thailand where he began his field research on Southeast Asian and Indonesian fresh water fishes. In 1997 he wrote an important revision on the genus Coregonus, which includes the fish species from Lake Geneva, Lake Constance and other lakes in Switzerland. Together with Dr. Tan Heok Hui he worked in Sumatra, where they discovered Paedocypris progenetica, which is considered the smallest fish in the world. In 2007 he published a Handbook of European Freshwater Fishes together with Jörg Freyhof. Kottelat has described more than 440 fish species new to science.

In 2006 he was awarded a Doctor Honoris Causa degree at the University of Neuchâtel. Kottelat is the former (1997–2007) and present (2012–present) president of the European Ichthyological Society. He is a commissioner of the International Commission on Zoological Nomenclature. For most of his career, he has held no academic position but worked as a "freelance taxonomist".

== Publications (selected) ==
- 1990 Maurice Kottelat: Indochinese Nemacheilines, a revision of nemacheiline loaches (Pisces: Cypriniformes) of Thailand, Burma, Laos, Cambodia and southern Viet Nam. 180 text-figures. 8vo, pp. 262
- 1996 Maurice Kottelat & Tony Whitten: Freshwater Biodiversity in Asia: With Special Reference to Fish
- 1997 Maurice Kottelat: European Freshwater fishes. An heuristic checklist of the freshwater fishes of Europe (exclusive of former USSR), with an introduction for non-systematists and comments on nomenclature and conservation. Biologia (Bratislava) Sect. Zool., 52 (Suppl.):1-271.
- 1997 Maurice Kottelat: Freshwater Fishes of Western Indonesia and Sulawesi
- 1998 Maurice Kottelat: Fishes of Brazil - An Aid to the Study of Spix and Agassiz's (1829-31) Selecta Genera et Species Piscium Brasiliensium Including an English Translation of the Entire Text by V.L. Wirasinha and Reproduction of all Illustrations
- 1998 Maurice Kottelat: Fishes of the Nam Theun and Xe Bangfai basins, Laos, with diagnoses of twenty-two new species (Teleostei: Cyprinidae, Balitoridae, Cobitidae, Coiidae and Odontobutidae). Ichthyol. Explor. Freshwat. 9(1):1-128.
- 2001 Maurice Kottelat : Fishes of Laos
- 2001 Maurice Kottelat: Freshwater fishes of Northern Vietnam: A preliminary check-list of the fishes known or expected to occur in Northern Vietnam : with comments on systematics and nomenclature
- 2007 Maurice Kottelat & Jörg Freyhof: Handbook of European Freshwater Fishes Published by the authors. ISBN 978-2-8399-0298-4
- 2012 Maurice Kottelat: Conspectus cobitidum: an inventory of the loaches of the world (Teleostei: Cypriniformes: Cobitoidei) Raffles Bulletin of Zoology, Supplement 26: 1–199.
- 2013 Maurice Kottelat: The fishes of inland waters of Southeast Asia: a catalogue and core bibliography of the fishes known to occur in freshwaters, mangroves and estuaries. Raffles Bulletin of Zoology, Supplement 27: 1–663.

== Taxa described by him ==
- See Category:Taxa named by Maurice Kottelat

== Taxa named in his honor ==
- Exostoma kottelati Darshan, Vishwanath, Abujam & Das, 2019
- The monospecific genus Kottelatia Liao, Kullander & Fang, 2010
- The genus Kottelatlimia Nalbant, 1994
- Monodactylus kottelati Pethiyagoda, 1991
- Neogastromyzon kottelati Tan, 2006
- Oxynoemacheilus kottelati Turan, Aksu, Güçlü & Kalayci, 2024
- Rasbora kottelati K. K. P. Lim, 1995
- Salmo kottelati Turan, Doğan, Kaya, & Kanyılmaz, 2014 is named after him.
- Schistura kottelati Ho, Hoang & Ngo, 2018
- Squalius kottelati (Karaman, 1972)
- Tondanichthys kottelati Collette, 1995
