= Zimmeriana azumai =

Scientific classification
- Domain: Eukaryota
- Kingdom: Animalia
- Phylum: Arthropoda
- Class: Malacostraca
- Order: Cumacea
- Family: Gynodiastylidae
- Genus: Zimmeriana
- Species: Z. azumai

Binomial name
- Zimmeriana azumai Gamô, 1986

Species of crustacean

Zimmeriana azumai is a gynodiastylid cumacean. This marine crustacean is found in Japan at depths between 11m and 50m.
