= Cyclaspis elegans =

Scientific classification
- Domain: Eukaryota
- Kingdom: Animalia
- Phylum: Arthropoda
- Class: Malacostraca
- Order: Cumacea
- Family: Bodotriidae
- Genus: Cyclaspis
- Species: C. elegans

Binomial name
- Cyclaspis elegans Calman, 1907

Species of crustacean

Cyclaspis elegans is a species of small marine crustacean (cumacean) in the genus Cyclaspis that lives in Lyttelton Harbour, New Zealand.
