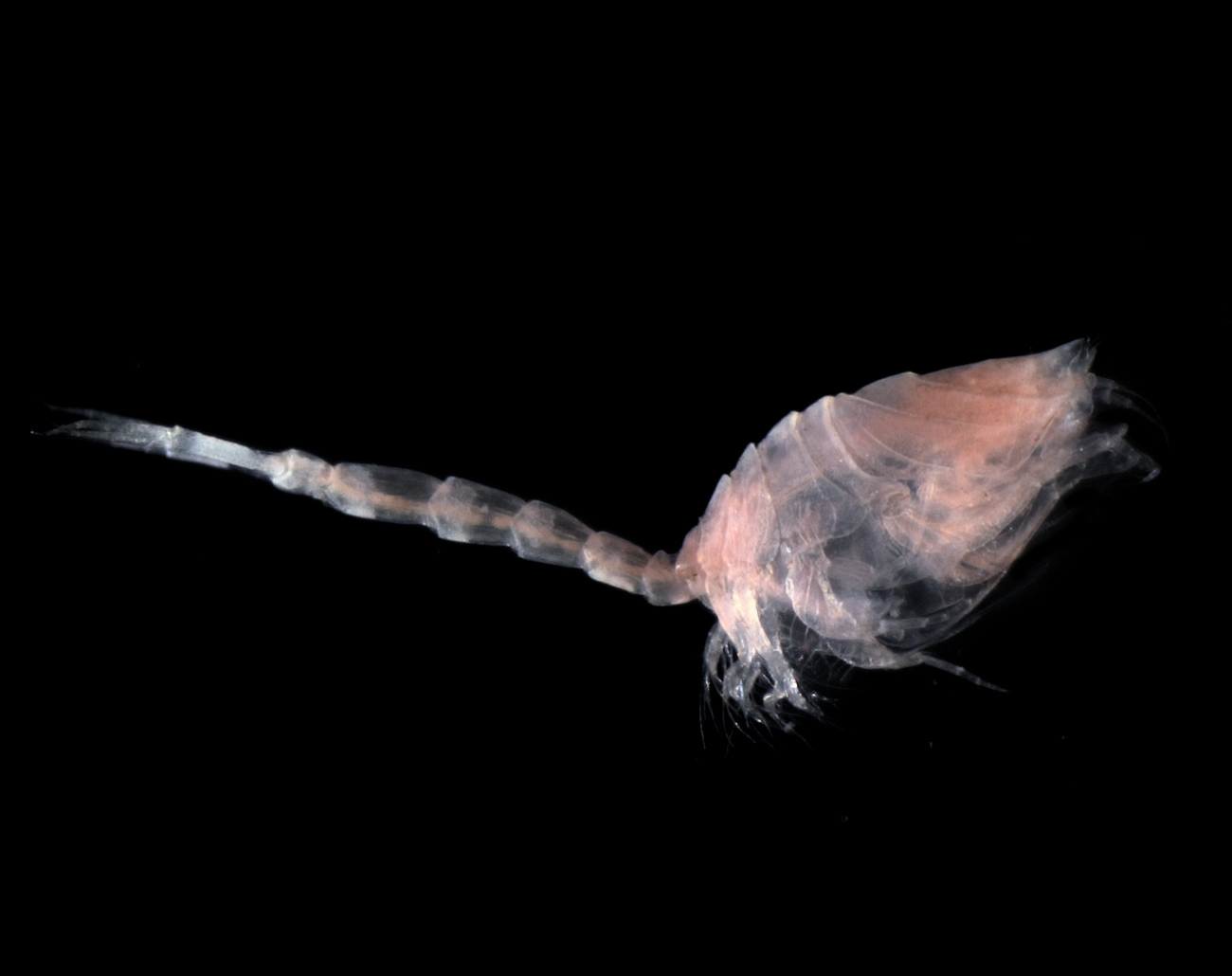

Scientific classification
- Domain: Eukaryota
- Kingdom: Animalia
- Phylum: Arthropoda
- Class: Malacostraca
- Order: Cumacea
- Family: Pseudocumatidae
- Genus: Pseudocuma
- Species: P. simile

Binomial name
- Pseudocuma simile Sars, 1900

Synonyms
- Pseudocuma similis

= Pseudocuma simile =

Species of crustacean

Pseudocuma simile is a marine species of cumacean (hooded or comma shrimp) in the family Pseudocumatidae.

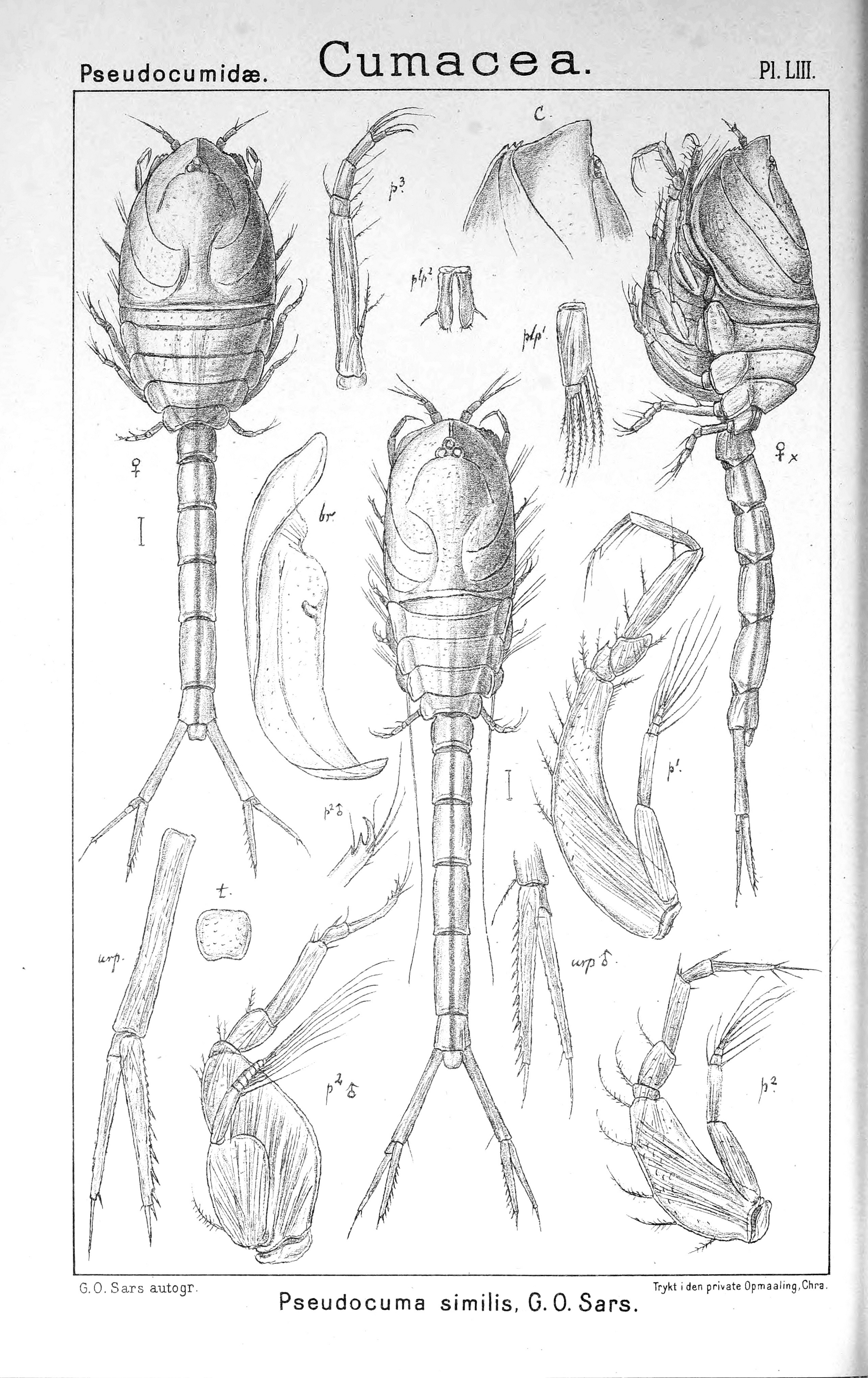
Diagram of P. simile by its describer, Georg Ossian Sars

== Habitat ==
Lives in the seas around Europe.

== Description ==
Grows up to 5.5 mm (0.22 in) long. P. simile has a freely-articulated telson. The anterolateral angle of the carapace is shallow and has three teeth.
