= Cumopsis fagei =

Scientific classification
- Kingdom: Animalia
- Phylum: Arthropoda
- Clade: Pancrustacea
- Class: Malacostraca
- Order: Cumacea
- Family: Bodotriidae
- Genus: Cumopsis
- Species: C. fagei

Binomial name
- Cumopsis fagei (Băcescu, 1956)

Species of hooded shrimp

Cumopsis fagei is a species of hooded shrimp from the family Bodotriidae. It is named for the French zoologist Louis Fage, and so should be pronounced /ˈfɑːʒiː/.

Body plan of a typical cumacean. See in article text for C. fagei's difference from this image.

== Description ==
C. fagei is small, about 6 mm (1/4 inch) long.

C. fagei can be differentiated from similar cumaceans in that it has:

- a carapace without lateral folds
- pereon segments are smooth dorsally
- the female uropod ('tail-foot') is as long as the combined length of the three posterior pleon segments
- the proximal segment of the exopod is longer than the distal segment, which terminates with a strong spine but lacks spines on its inner edge

== Ecology ==
As with other hooded shrimp, C. fagei is gonochoric and sexually dimorphic. It swarms nocturnally to breed. Females brood eggs in the brood pouch (marsupium), where they moult, become mancas and leave.

== Distribution ==
Cumopsis fagei is found in the Eastern Atlantic, off of Ireland, Great Britain, Morocco and France. It lives in the demersal zone, sandy beaches and in the sublittoral zone.
