= Zimmeriana longirostris =

Scientific classification
- Domain: Eukaryota
- Kingdom: Animalia
- Phylum: Arthropoda
- Class: Malacostraca
- Order: Cumacea
- Family: Gynodiastylidae
- Genus: Zimmeriana
- Species: Z. longirostris

Binomial name
- Zimmeriana longirostris Hale, 1946

Species of crustacean

Zimmeriana longirostris is a species of gynodiastylid cumacean. It is found from Western Australia to New South Wales at depths of 5-220m.
