= Eudorellopsis leuconi =

Scientific classification
- Domain: Eukaryota
- Kingdom: Animalia
- Phylum: Arthropoda
- Class: Malacostraca
- Order: Cumacea
- Family: Leuconidae
- Genus: Eudorellopsis
- Species: E. leuconi

Binomial name
- Eudorellopsis leuconi Vassilenko & Tzareva, 1990

Species of crustacean

Eudorellopsis leuconi is a species of hooded shrimp within the family Leuconidae. The species is demersal, living in Arctic waters around Russia.
