= Dimorphostylis echinata =

Scientific classification
- Domain: Eukaryota
- Kingdom: Animalia
- Phylum: Arthropoda
- Class: Malacostraca
- Order: Cumacea
- Family: Diastylidae
- Genus: Dimorphostylis
- Species: D. echinata

Binomial name
- Dimorphostylis echinata Gamo, 1962

Species of crustacean

Dimorphostylis echinata is a species of crustacean from the Diastylidae family. The scientific name of this species was first published in 1962 by Gamo.
