= Eudorella hwanghaensis =

Scientific classification
- Domain: Eukaryota
- Kingdom: Animalia
- Phylum: Arthropoda
- Class: Malacostraca
- Order: Cumacea
- Family: Leuconidae
- Genus: Eudorella
- Species: E. hwanghaensis

Binomial name
- Eudorella hwanghaensis Hong & Park, 1999

Species of crustacean

Eudorella hwanghaensis is a species of hooded shrimp within the family Leuconidae. It has a distribution within the Yellow Sea, where it lives in demersal environments up to depths of 78 meters. Like other members within Cumacea, E. hwanghaensis is sexually dimorphic and gonochoric. Spawning of the species is characterized by swarming during the night. Females brood eggs within the marsupium where they molt over time, eventually becoming mancas and leaving.
