= Zimmeriana lasiodactylum =

Scientific classification
- Kingdom: Animalia
- Phylum: Arthropoda
- Clade: Pancrustacea
- Class: Malacostraca
- Order: Cumacea
- Family: Gynodiastylidae
- Genus: Zimmeriana
- Species: Z. lasiodactylum

Binomial name
- Zimmeriana lasiodactylum Zimmer, 1914

Species of crustacean

Zimmeriana lasiodactylum is a species of cumacean, in the Gynodiastylidae family. It is found in Western Australia at depths of 9-23m. Specimens have been found of adult females and subadult males but not adult males.
