= D. bidentata =

D. bidentata may refer to:

- Diastylis bidentata, a marine crustacean
- Dolops bidentata, a carp louse
