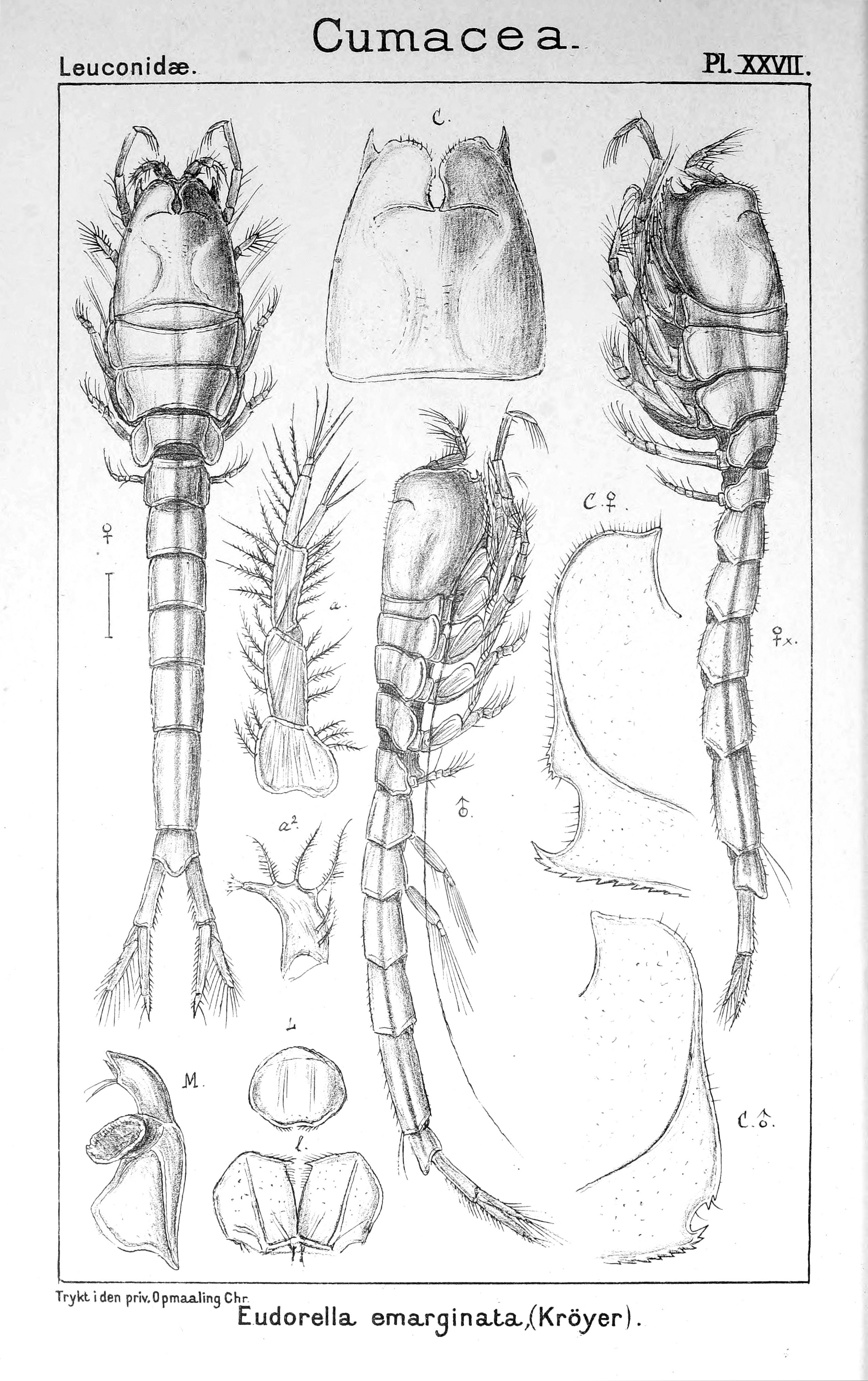
- Eudorella emarginata

Scientific classification
- Domain: Eukaryota
- Kingdom: Animalia
- Phylum: Arthropoda
- Class: Malacostraca
- Order: Cumacea
- Family: Leuconidae
- Genus: Eudorella; Norman, 1867

= Eudorella =

Genus of crustaceans

Eudorella is a genera of marine hooded shrimp in the family Leuconidae. Their skeletons are chitinous.

== Species ==
Placed by WoRMS.

- Eudorella abyssi Sars, 1887
- Eudorella acuticaudata Akiyama & Gamo, 2012
- Eudorella aequiremis Hansen, 1920
- Eudorella arctica Hansen, 1920
- Eudorella bacescui Petrescu, 1991
- Eudorella bathyalis Vassilenko & Tzareva, 2004
- Eudorella bathyhwanghaensis Akiyama & Gamo, 2012
- Eudorella breviflagella Akiyama & Gamo, 2012
- Eudorella dentata Lomakina, 1955
- Eudorella divae Muhlenhardt-Siegel, 2005
- Eudorella emarginata (Krøyer, 1846)
- Eudorella fallax Zimmer, 1909
- Eudorella flokkeri Mühlenhardt-Siegel, 2011
- Eudorella fusafusa Akiyama & Gamo, 2012
- Eudorella gottliebi Băcescu, 1961
- Eudorella gracilior Zimmer, 1907
- Eudorella gracilis Sars, 1871
- Eudorella groenlandica Zimmer, 1926
- Eudorella haradai Akiyama & Gamo, 2012
- Eudorella hirsuta (Sars, 1869)
- Eudorella hispida Sars, 1871
- Eudorella hurleyi Jones, 1963
- Eudorella hwanghaensis Hong & Park, 1999
- Eudorella intermedia Hansen, 1920
- Eudorella menziesi Petrescu, 1991
- Eudorella minor Lomakina, 1952
- Eudorella monodon Calman, 1912
- Eudorella nana Sars, 1879
- Eudorella ohtai Akiyama & Gamo, 2012
- Eudorella orientalis Akiyama & Gamo, 2012
- Eudorella pacifica Hart, 1930
- Eudorella parahirsuta Akiyama & Gamo, 2012
- Eudorella parvula Hansen, 1920
- Eudorella pusilla Sars, 1871
- Eudorella redacticruris Watling & McCann, 1996
- Eudorella rochfordi Hale, 1945
- Eudorella similis Calman, 1907
- Eudorella sordida Zimmer, 1907
- Eudorella spitzbergensis Zimmer, 1926
- Eudorella splendida Zimmer, 1902
- Eudorella suluensis Akiyama & Gamo, 2012
- Eudorella tridentata Hart, 1930
- Eudorella truncatula (Bate, 1856)
