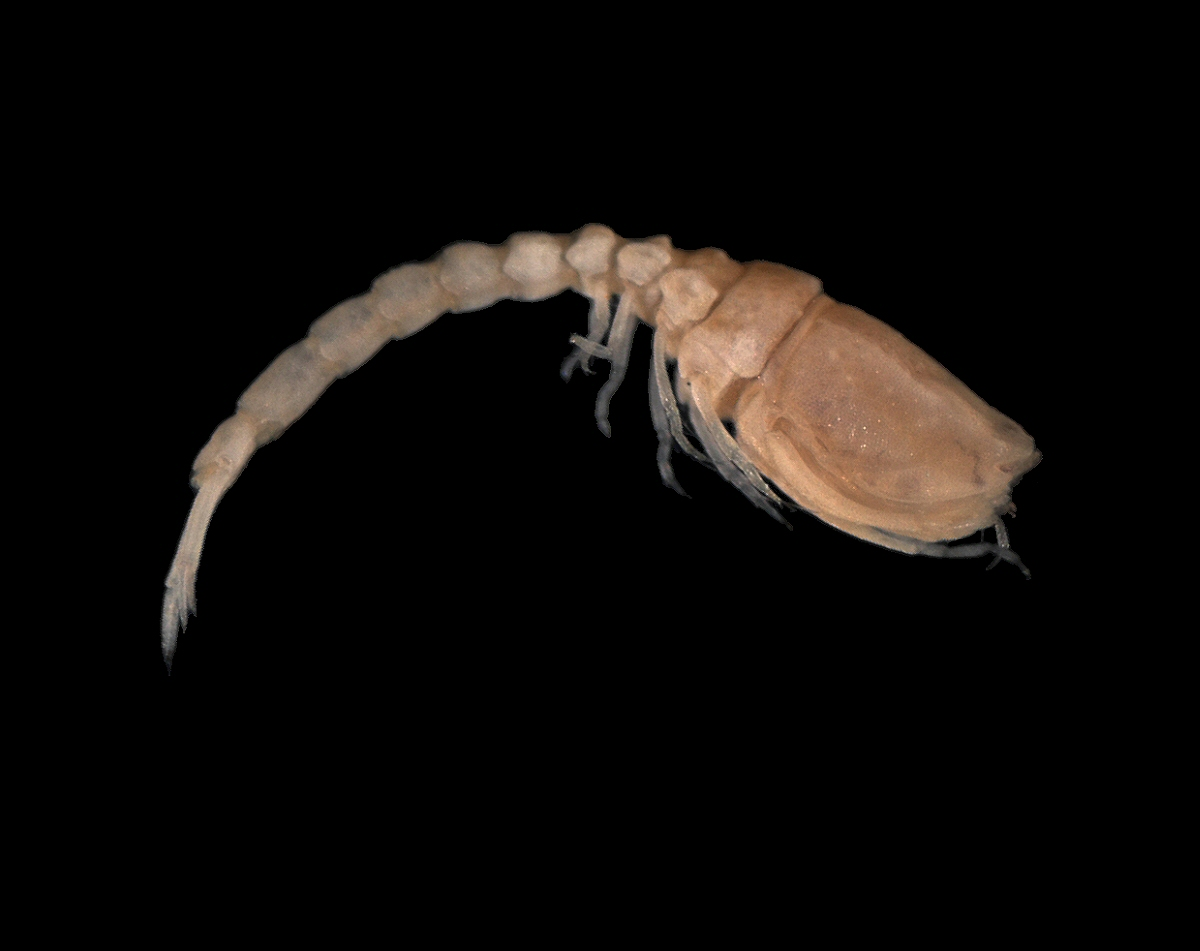
- Bodotria scorpioides

Scientific classification
- Domain: Eukaryota
- Kingdom: Animalia
- Phylum: Arthropoda
- Class: Malacostraca
- Order: Cumacea
- Family: Bodotriidae
- Subfamily: Bodotriinae
- Genus: Bodotria; Goodsir, 1843

Species
- See text

= Bodotria =

Genus of crustaceans

Bodotria is a genus of crustaceans which belong to the family Bodotriidae. It includes the following species:

- Bodotria africana Zimmer, 1908
- Bodotria alata Bacescu & Muradian, 1975
- Bodotria andamanensis Petrescu & Chatterjee, 2011
- Bodotria angusta Harada, 1967
- Bodotria arenosa Goodsir, 1843
- Bodotria arianii Petrescu, 2003
- Bodotria armata Tafe & Greenwood, 1996
- Bodotria armoricana Le Loeuff & Intes, 1977
- Bodotria australis Stebbing, 1912
- Bodotria bineti Le Loeuff & Intes, 1977
- Bodotria biocellata Radhadevi & Kurian, 1989
- Bodotria biplicata Gamo, 1964
- Bodotria carinata Gamo, 1964
- Bodotria choprai Kurian, 1951
- Bodotria clara Day, 1978
- Bodotria corallina Muhlenhardt-Siegel, 2000
- Bodotria cribraria Le Loeuff & Intes, 1972
- Bodotria depressa Harada, 1967
- Bodotria dispar Harada, 1967
- Bodotria elevata Jones, 1960
- Bodotria falsinus Day, 1978
- Bodotria furugelmiensis Tzareva & Vassilenko, 2006
- Bodotria gibba (Sars, 1878)
- Bodotria glabra Jones, 1955
- Bodotria intermedia Le Loeuff & Intes, 1977
- Bodotria iroensis Harada, 1967
- Bodotria laevigata Le Loeuff & Intes, 1977
- Bodotria lata Jones, 1956
- Bodotria maculosa Hale, 1944
- Bodotria magna Zimmer, 1921
- Bodotria minuta Kurian, 1961
- Bodotria montagui Stebbing, 1912
- Bodotria nitida Day, 1978
- Bodotria nuda Harada, 1967
- Bodotria ovalis Gamo, 1965
- Bodotria ozolinshi Tsareva & Vassilenko, 1993
- Bodotria parva Calman, 1907
- Bodotria parvui Petrescu, 2008
- Bodotria platybasis Radhadevi & Kurian, 1981
- Bodotria prionura Zimmer, 1952
- Bodotria pulchella (Sars, 1878)
- Bodotria pulex (Zimmer, 1903)
- Bodotria rugosa Gamo, 1963
- Bodotria scorpioides (Montagu, 1804)
- Bodotria serica Day, 1978
- Bodotria serrata Harada, 1967
- Bodotria serrulata Gamo, 1965
- Bodotria setoensis Harada, 1967
- Bodotria similis Calman, 1907
- Bodotria spinifera Gamo, 1986
- Bodotria sublevis Calman, 1907
- Bodotria tenuis Day, 1978
- Bodotria tosaensis Harada, 1967
- Bodotria unacarina Muhlenhardt-Siegel, 2003
