= Petalosarsia brevirostris =

Scientific classification
- Kingdom: Animalia
- Phylum: Arthropoda
- Class: Malacostraca
- Order: Cumacea
- Family: Pseudocumatidae
- Genus: Petalosarsia
- Species: P. brevirostris

Binomial name
- Petalosarsia brevirostris Gamo, 1986

Petalosarsia brevirostris is a crustacean species in the genus Petalosarsia.
