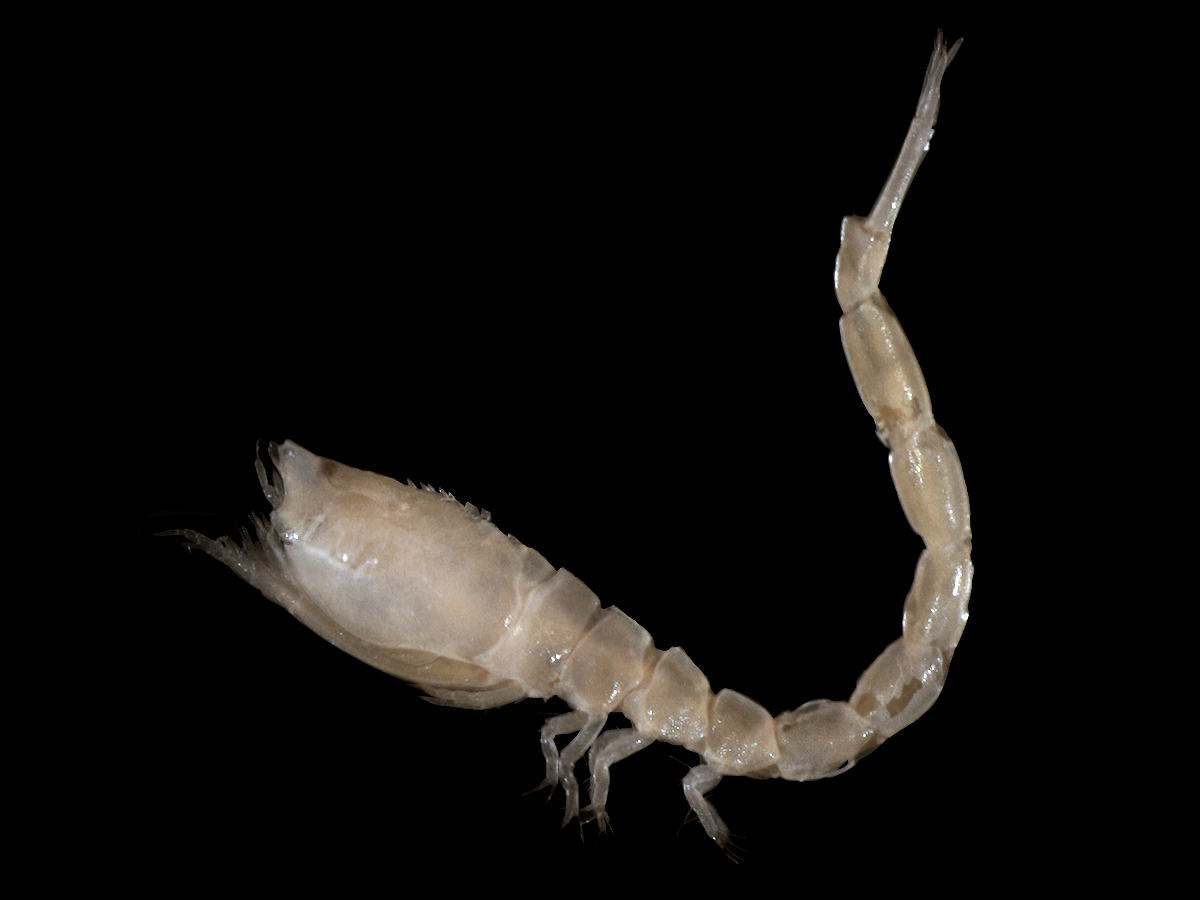
- Iphinoe trispinosa

Scientific classification
- Domain: Eukaryota
- Kingdom: Animalia
- Phylum: Arthropoda
- Class: Malacostraca
- Order: Cumacea
- Family: Bodotriidae
- Subfamily: Bodotriinae
- Genus: Iphinoe; Bate, 1856

Type species
- Cuma trispinosa Goodsir, 1843

= Iphinoe =

Genus of crustaceans

Iphinoe is a genus of crustaceans which belong to the family Bodotriidae. It includes the following species:

- Iphinoe acutirostris Ledoyer, 1965
- Iphinoe adriatica Băcescu, 1988
- Iphinoe africana Zimmer, 1908
- Iphinoe armata Ledoyer, 1965
- Iphinoe brevipes Hansen, 1895
- Iphinoe calmani Fage, 1945
- Iphinoe canariensis Corbera, Brito & Nunez, 2002
- Iphinoe capensis (Zimmer, 1921)
- Iphinoe coronata Gould, 1861
- Iphinoe crassipes Hansen, 1895
- Iphinoe dayi Jones, 1960
- Iphinoe douniae Ledoyer, 1965
- Iphinoe elisae Băcescu, 1950
- Iphinoe fagei Jones, 1955
- Iphinoe gurjanovae Lomakina, 1960
- Iphinoe hupferi Zimmer, 1916
- Iphinoe inermis Sars, 1878
- Iphinoe insolita Petrescu, 1992
- Iphinoe ischnura Zimmer, 1952
- Iphinoe kroyeri Philippi, 1849
- Iphinoe maculata Ledoyer, 1965
- Iphinoe maeotica Sowinskyi, 1893
- Iphinoe marisrubrae Muhlenhardt-Siegel, 1996
- Iphinoe pellucida Hale, 1944
- Iphinoe pigmenta Kurian, 1961
- Iphinoe plicata Le Loeuff & Intes, 1972
- Iphinoe pokoui Le Loeuff & Intes, 1972
- Iphinoe producta Day, 1978
- Iphinoe rhodaniensis Ledoyer, 1965
- Iphinoe robusta Hansen, 1895
- Iphinoe sagamiensis Gamo, 1958
- Iphinoe sanguinea Kemp, 1916
- Iphinoe senegalensis Jones, 1956
- Iphinoe serrata Norman, 1867
- Iphinoe solida Aurivillius, 1885
- Iphinoe stebbingi Jones, 1956
- Iphinoe tenella Sars, 1878
- Iphinoe tenera Lomakina, 1960
- Iphinoe trispinosa (Goodsir, 1843)
- Iphinoe truncata Hale, 1953
- Iphinoe zimmeri Stebbing, 1910
