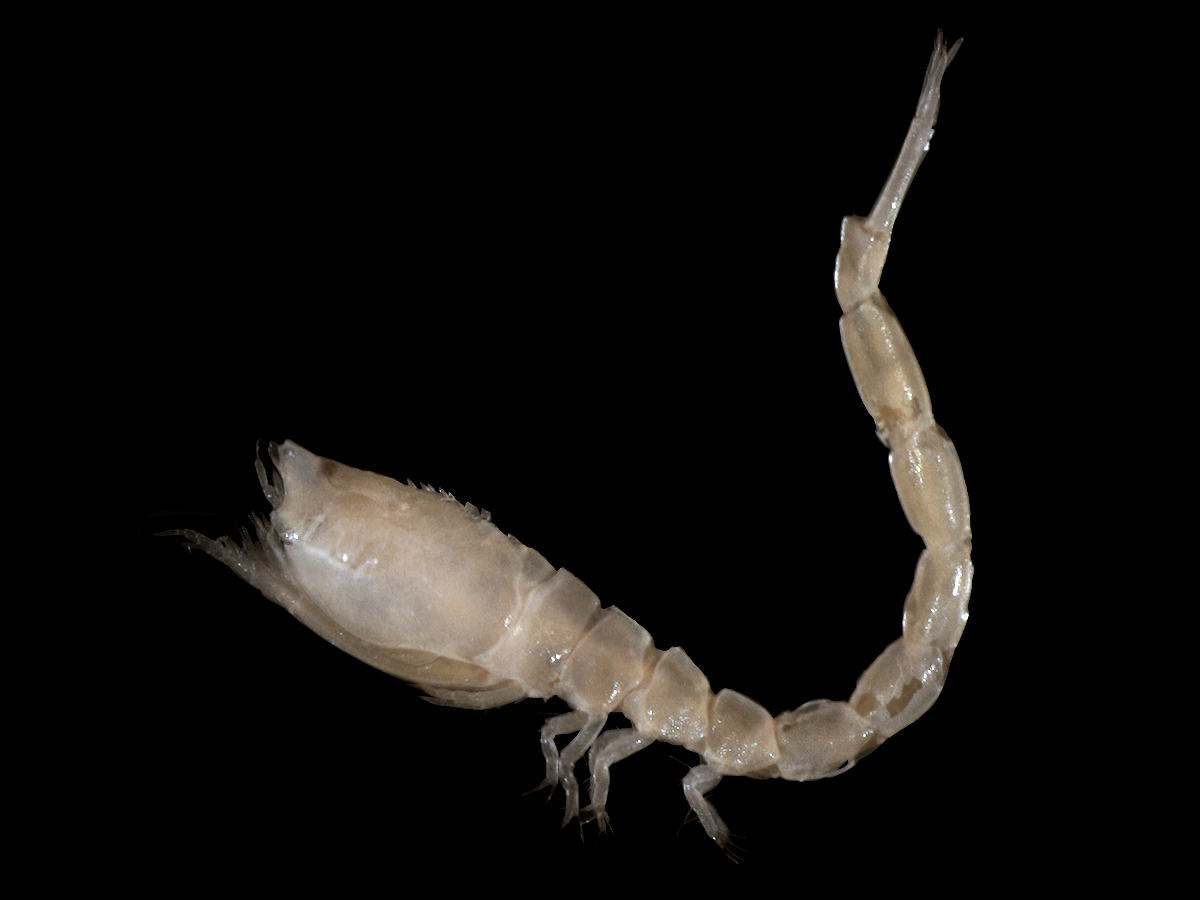

Scientific classification
- Domain: Eukaryota
- Kingdom: Animalia
- Phylum: Arthropoda
- Class: Malacostraca
- Order: Cumacea
- Family: Bodotriidae
- Genus: Iphinoe
- Species: I. trispinosa

Binomial name
- Iphinoe trispinosa (Goodsir, 1843)
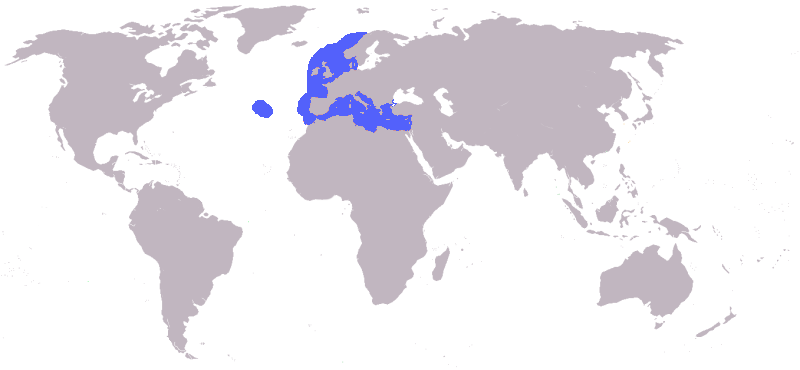
- Distribution of Iphinoe trispinosa

= Iphinoe trispinosa =

Species of crustacean

Iphinoe trispinosa is a species of cumacean belonging to the family Bodotriidae and the genus Iphinoe.

== Anatomy ==
I. trispinosa is a slender cumacean which grows up to 10 mm long. The carapace is approximately twice as long as it is high, and in the male, which has a rounded pseudorostrum, rather smooth. The female has two to six small serrations in the middle of the dorsal ridge of the carapace, and a sharply leading pseudorostrum.

Both males and females are strongly pigmented. The male has — like all members of the family Bodotriidae — five pairs of pleopods. Their colour is whitish to straw-coloured.

== Habitat ==
I. trispinosa are usually found in fine sand beaches, such as those formed by silt deposits. They prefer shallower depths, but may be found as deep as 150 m. During summer nights the males emerge from sand, swarming to the surface, frequently attracted by light. They are found from Norway to the Moroccan coast, around the Canary Islands and in the Mediterranean Sea.
