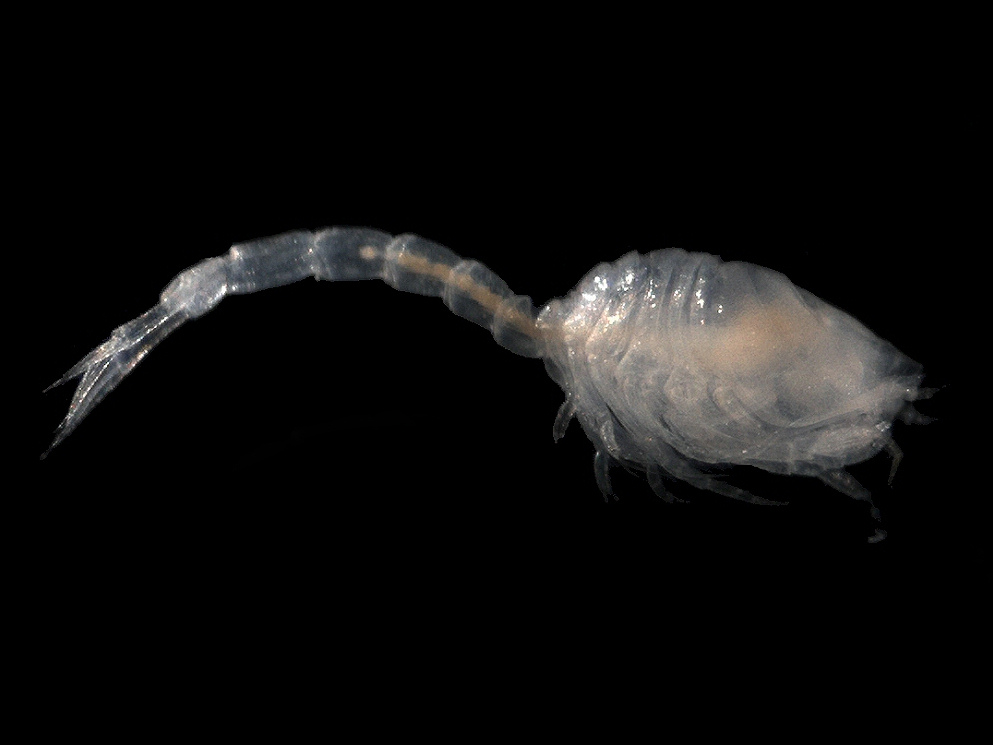
- Pseudocuma longicorne

Scientific classification
- Domain: Eukaryota
- Kingdom: Animalia
- Phylum: Arthropoda
- Class: Malacostraca
- Order: Cumacea
- Family: Pseudocumatidae
- Genus: Pseudocuma; G. O. Sars, 1865

= Pseudocuma =

Genus of crustaceans

Pseudocuma is a genus of cumaceans, including the following species:

- Pseudocuma cercarioides Sars, 1894
- Pseudocuma chevreuxi Fage, 1928
- Pseudocuma ciliatum Sars, 1879
- Pseudocuma diastyloides Sars, 1897
- Pseudocuma gracile Sars, 1894
- Pseudocuma graciloides Sars, 1894
- Pseudocuma laeve Sars, 1914
- Pseudocuma lagunae Baker, 1912
- Pseudocuma longicorne (Bate, 1858)
- Pseudocuma simile Sars, 1900
- Pseudocuma tenuicauda Sars, 1894
