= P. brevirostris =

P. brevirostris may refer to:

- Pachycrocuta brevirostris, a prehistoric hyena species
- Pericrocotus brevirostris, the short-billed minivet, a bird species
- Petalosarsia brevirostris, a marine crustacean species
- Phyllodytes brevirostris, a frog species endemic to Brazil
