= Austroleucon =

Scientific classification
- Domain: Eukaryota
- Kingdom: Animalia
- Phylum: Arthropoda
- Class: Malacostraca
- Order: Cumacea
- Family: Leuconidae
- Genus: Austroleucon; Watling, 1991

Genus of crustaceans

Austroleucon is a genus of hooded shrimps within the family Leuconidae. There are currently 3 species assigned to the genus.

== Species ==
- Austroleucon adiazetos Gerken, 2016
- Austroleucon dolosolevis Gerken, 2016
- Austroleucon levis (Hale, 1945)
