= Chalarostylis =

Scientific classification
- Kingdom: Animalia
- Phylum: Arthropoda
- Clade: Pancrustacea
- Class: Malacostraca
- Order: Cumacea
- Family: Lampropidae
- Genus: Chalarostylis; Norman, 1879

Species
- Chalarostylis elegans; Chalarostylis guanchi

Genus of crustaceans

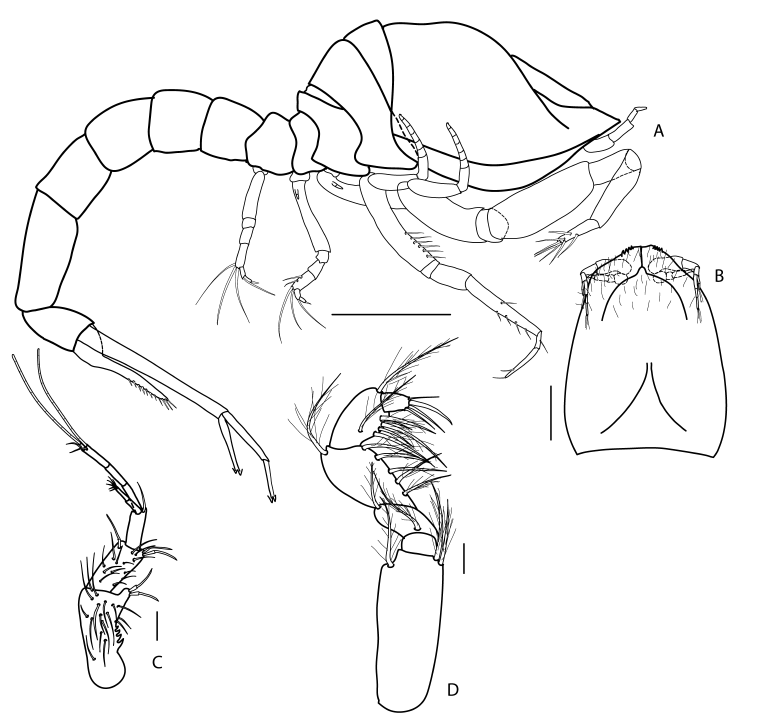
Chalarostylis bruunae n. sp. Holotype female USNM 389843 A, side view; B, dorsal view of carapace; C, antennule; D, maxilliped 2. Scale bars full body 1.0 mm, all others 0.1 mm.

Chalarostylis is a genus of cumacean crustaceans in the Lampropidae family, containing two species, including the one formerly placed in Dasylamprops, which is now considered a synonym of Chalarostylis.

Chalarostylis elegans was described by Norman in 1879, while Chalarostylis guanchi was described as Dasylamprops guanchi by Reyss in 1978.
