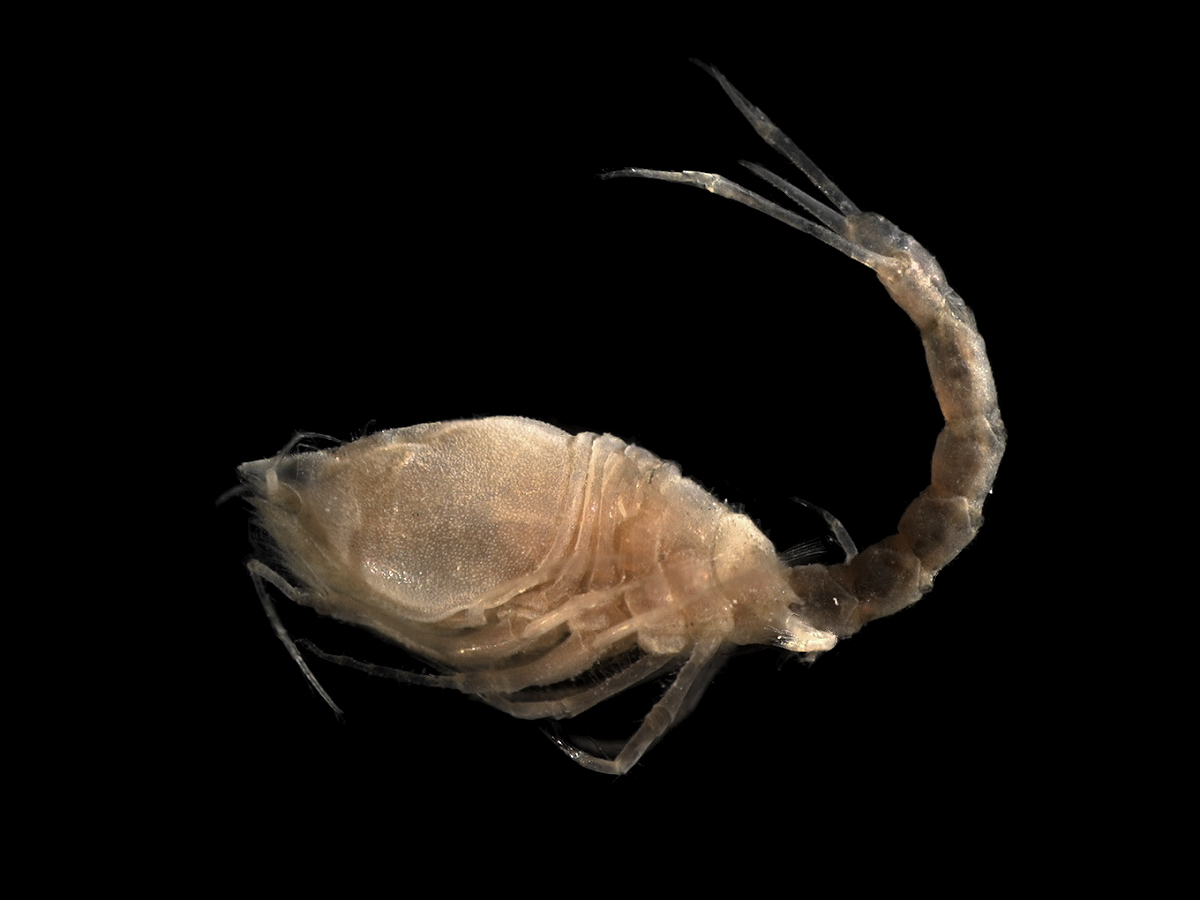

Scientific classification
- Domain: Eukaryota
- Kingdom: Animalia
- Phylum: Arthropoda
- Class: Malacostraca
- Order: Cumacea
- Family: Diastylidae
- Genus: Diastylis
- Species: D. laevis

Binomial name
- Diastylis laevis (Norman, 1869)

Synonyms
- Alauna rostrata Goodsir, 1843; Diastylis rostrata (Goodsir, 1843)

= Diastylis laevis =

Species of crustacean

Diastylis laevis is a species of crustacean belonging to the order Cumacea and the genus Diastylis. It occurs from Skagerrak to the Côte d'Ivoire, but not in the Mediterranean Sea. It grows up to 11 millimetres (0.43 in) long.
