= Jennidayus =

Scientific classification
- Domain: Eukaryota
- Kingdom: Animalia
- Phylum: Arthropoda
- Class: Malacostraca
- Superorder: Peracarida
- Order: Cumacea
- Family: Gynodiastylidae
- Genus: Jennidayus; Zhang, Gerken and Chen 2014

Synonyms
- Dayus Gerken, 2001

Genus of crustaceans

Jennidayus is a genus of hooded shrimps in the family Gynodiastylidae. They Jennidayus is a genus of hooded shrimps in the family Gynodiastylidae. There are three species in this genus, found in Australia.

== Species ==
Jennidayus contains these three species:

Jennidayus acanthus (Gerken, 2001)
Jennidayus makrokolosus (Gerken, 2001)
Jennidayus pharocheradus (Gerken, 2001)
