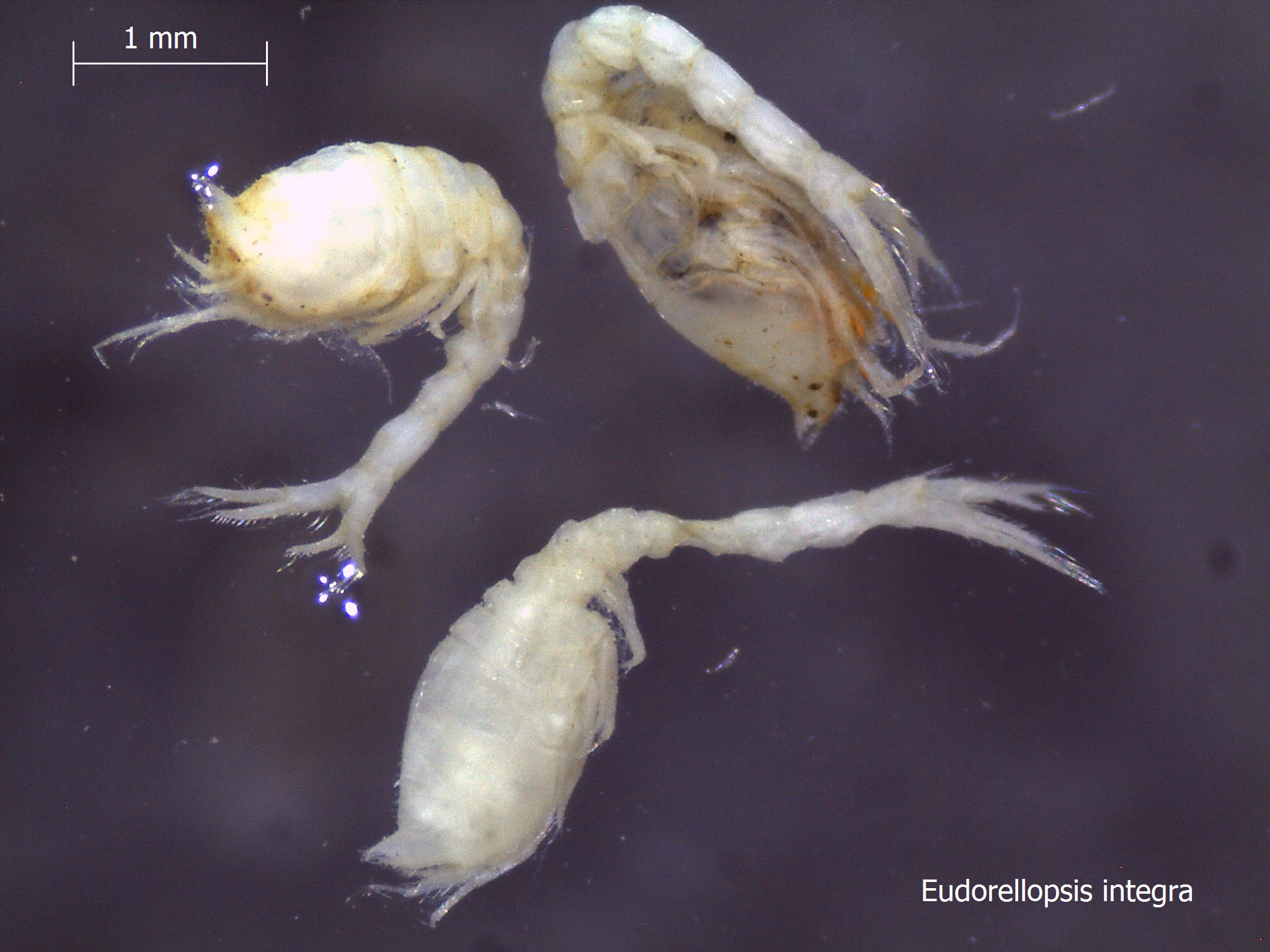
- Eudorellopsis integra

Scientific classification
- Domain: Eukaryota
- Kingdom: Animalia
- Phylum: Arthropoda
- Class: Malacostraca
- Order: Cumacea
- Family: Leuconidae
- Genus: Eudorellopsis; Sars, 1882

= Eudorellopsis =

Genus of crustaceans

Eudorellopsis is a genus of hooded shrimps within the family Leuconidae. There are currently 9 species assigned to the genus.

== Species ==
- Eudorellopsis biplicata Calman, 1912
- Eudorellopsis deformis (Krøyer, 1846)
- Eudorellopsis derzhavini Lomakina, 1952
- Eudorellopsis integra (S.I. Smith, 1879)
- Eudorellopsis leuconi Vassilenko & Tzareva, 1990
- Eudorellopsis longirostris Given, 1961
- Eudorellopsis mykteros Gerken, 2016
- Eudorellopsis resima Calman, 1907
- Eudorellopsis uschakovi Lomakina, 1955
