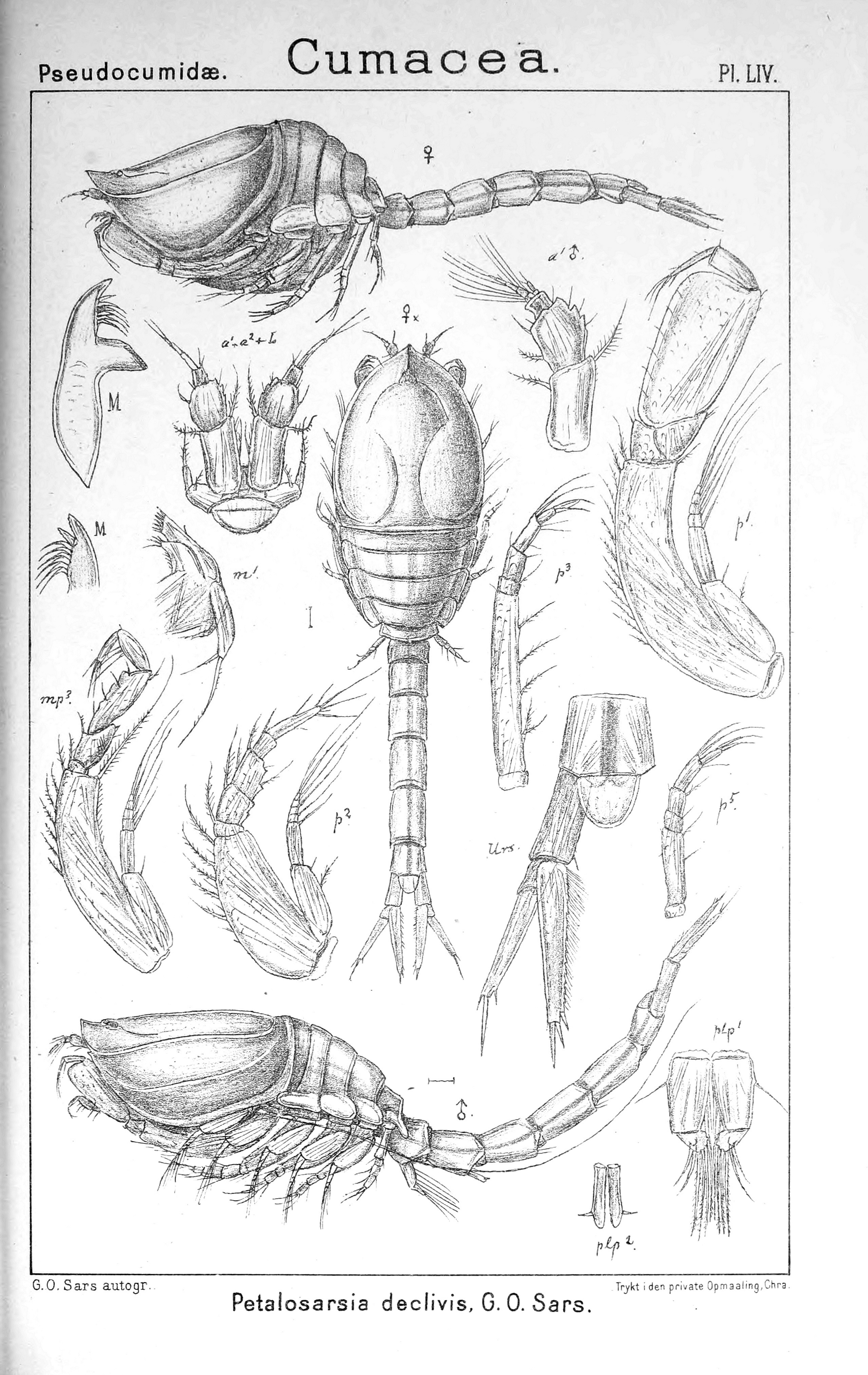
- Illustration of Petalosarsia declivis

Scientific classification
- Domain: Eukaryota
- Kingdom: Animalia
- Phylum: Arthropoda
- Class: Malacostraca
- Order: Cumacea
- Family: Pseudocumatidae
- Genus: Petalosarsia; Stebbing, 1893

= Petalosarsia =

Genus of crustaceans

Petalosarsia is a crustacean genus in the family Pseudocumatidae, comprising three species:

- Petalosarsia brevirostris Gamo, 1986
- Petalosarsia declivis (Sars, 1865)
- Petalosarsia longirostris Jones, 1973
