= Zimmeriana =

Scientific classification
- Domain: Eukaryota
- Kingdom: Animalia
- Phylum: Arthropoda
- Class: Malacostraca
- Order: Cumacea
- Family: Gynodiastylidae
- Genus: Zimmeriana; Hale, 1946

Genus of crustaceans

Zimmeriana is a genus of gynodiastylid cumacean. It is found from New South Wales to Western Australia, and in Japan. It contains 6 species, as of March, 2017.

== Description ==
Zimmeriana females and sub-adult males have two pseudorostral lobes which are horizontal. The eye lobes have no lenses, and may or may not have a pair of spines. The first antenna is small to moderate in size. The first pereopod has a brush of many long setae terminally on the dactyl.

In males, the pseudorostral lobes are horizontally or vertically directed. Eye lobes with or without lenses. The second antenna's peduncle has 4 articles, and the flagellum has 7 articles. There are exopods on the third maxilliped and pereopod 1-4.

== Species ==
Zimmeriana has 6 currently (March, 2017) accepted species:

- Zimmeriana azumai Gamô, 1986
- Zimmeriana lasiodactylum Zimmer, 1914
- Zimmeriana longirostris Hale, 1946
- Zimmeriana robustacrus Gerken, 2001
- Zimmeriana spinicauda Hale, 1946
- Zimmeriana vibrissa Gerken, 2001
