= C. reticulata =

C. reticulata may refer to:

- Camellia reticulata, a plant species native to southwestern China, in the Yunnan Province
- Citrus reticulata, the mandarin orange, a tree species
- Cyclaspis reticulata, a crustacean species in the genus Cyclaspis

== Synonyms ==
- Cassia reticulata, a synonym for Senna reticulata, a plant species
