= Diastylis bidentata =

Scientific classification
- Domain: Eukaryota
- Kingdom: Animalia
- Phylum: Arthropoda
- Class: Malacostraca
- Order: Cumacea
- Family: Diastylidae
- Genus: Diastylis
- Species: D. bidentata

Binomial name
- Diastylis bidentata (Calman, 1912)

Species of crustacean

Diastylis bidentata is a common benthic crustacean species.
