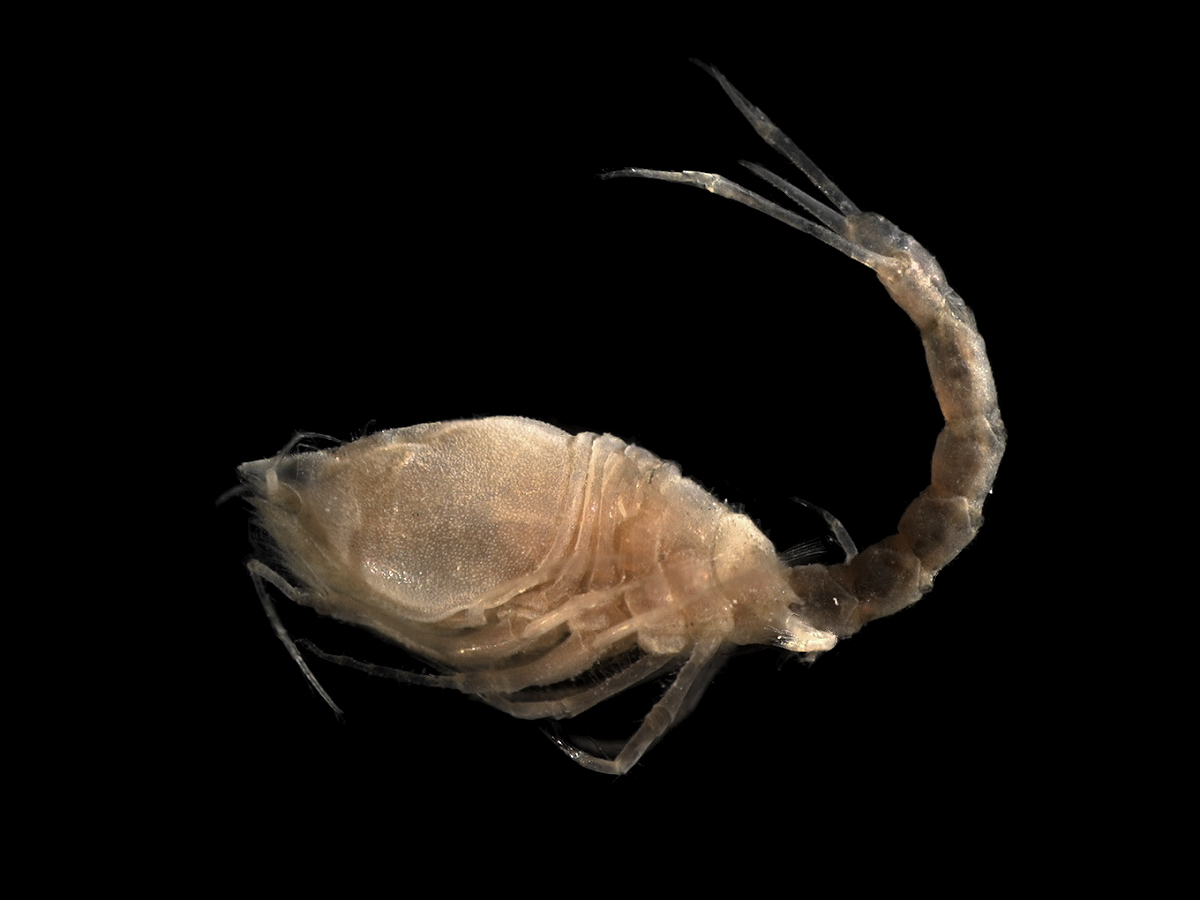
- Diastylis laevis

Scientific classification
- Domain: Eukaryota
- Kingdom: Animalia
- Phylum: Arthropoda
- Class: Malacostraca
- Order: Cumacea
- Family: Diastylidae
- Genus: Diastylis; Say, 1818

Type species
- Cuma rathkii Krøyer, 1841

= Diastylis =

Genus of arthropods

Diastylis is a genus of crustaceans which belong to the family Diastylidae. It includes the following species:

- Diastylis abboti Gladfelter, 1975
- Diastylis abbreviata G. O. Sars, 1871
- Diastylis acuminata Jones, 1960
- Diastylis alaskensis Calman, 1912
- Diastylis algoae Zimmer, 1908
- Diastylis ambigua Le Loeuff & Intes, 1972
- Diastylis anderssoni Zimmer, 1907
- Diastylis antillensis Sars, 1873
- Diastylis araruamae Petrescu & Băcescu, 1991
- Diastylis argentata Calman, 1912
- Diastylis aspera Calman, 1912
- Diastylis bidentata Calman, 1912
- Diastylis bispinosa (Stimpson, 1853)
- Diastylis boecki Zimmer, 1930
- Diastylis bradyi Norman, 1879
- Diastylis brasilianus Băcescu & Petrescu, 1991
- Diastylis calderoni Donath-Hernandez, 1988
- Diastylis californica Zimmer, 1936
- Diastylis corniculata Hale, 1937
- Diastylis cornuifer Blake, 1929
- Diastylis cornuta (Boeck, 1864)
- Diastylis crenellata Watling & McCann, 1996
- Diastylis dalli Calman, 1912
- Diastylis delicata Jones, 1969
- Diastylis denticulata Jones, 1956
- Diastylis dollfusi Fage, 1928
- Diastylis doryphora Fage, 1940
- Diastylis echinata Bate, 1865
- Diastylis edwardsii (Krøyer, 1841)
- Diastylis enigmatica Ledoyer, 1993
- Diastylis exilicauda Jones, 1969
- Diastylis fimbriata Sars, 1873
- Diastylis galeronae Ledoyer, 1993
- Diastylis gayi (Nicolet, 1849)
- Diastylis geocostae Băcescu & Petrescu, 1991
- Diastylis gibbera Jones, 1969
- Diastylis goodsiri (Bell, 1855)
- Diastylis granulata Zimmer, 1921
- Diastylis hammoniae Zimmer, 1902
- Diastylis hexaceros Zimmer, 1908
- Diastylis hirsuta Petrescu & Băcescu, 1991
- Diastylis horrida Sars, 1886
- Diastylis inermis Ledoyer, 1988
- Diastylis inornata Hale, 1937
- Diastylis inplicata Park & Hong, 1999
- Diastylis insularum (Calman, 1908)
- Diastylis jonesi Reyss, 1972
- Diastylis justi Petrescu & Băcescu, 1991
- Diastylis koreana Calman, 1911
- Diastylis krameri Zimmer, 1921
- Diastylis laevis Norman, 1869
- Diastylis lazarevi Lomakina, 1955
- Diastylis lepechini Zimmer, 1926
- Diastylis loricata Lomakina, 1955
- Diastylis lucifera (Krøyer, 1837)
- Diastylis manca (Sars), 1873
- Diastylis matsuei Gamo, 1968
- Diastylis mawsoni Calman, 1918
- Diastylis namibiae Day, 1980
- Diastylis neapolitana Sars, 1879
- Diastylis neozealanica Thomson, 1892
- Diastylis nitens Gamo, 1968
- Diastylis nucella Calman, 1912
- Diastylis omorii Gamo, 1968
- Diastylis ornata Lomakina, 1952
- Diastylis oxyrhyncha Zimmer, 1926
- Diastylis paralaskensis Vassilenko & Tzareva, 1990
- Diastylis paraspinulosa Zimmer, 1926
- Diastylis paratricinta Kang & Lee, 1996
- Diastylis pellucida Hart, 1930
- Diastylis planifrons Calman, 1912
- Diastylis polaris Sars, 1871
- Diastylis polita Smith, 1879
- Diastylis pseudinornata Ledoyer, 1977
- Diastylis quadriplicata Watling & McCann, 1996
- Diastylis quadrispinosa G. O. Sars, 1871
- Diastylis racovitzai Băcescu & Petrescu, 1991
- Diastylis rathkei (Krøyer, 1841)
- Diastylis richardi Fage, 1929
- Diastylis rostrata Goodsir, 1885
- Diastylis rugosa Sars, 1865
- Diastylis samurai Zimmer, 1943
- Diastylis santamariensis Watling & McCann, 1996
- Diastylis scorpioides (Lepechin, 1780)
- Diastylis sculpta G. O. Sars, 1871
- Diastylis sentosa Watling & McCann, 1996
- Diastylis serratocostata Watling & McCann, 1996
- Diastylis spinulosa Heller, 1875
- Diastylis stygia Sars, 1871
- Diastylis sulcata Calman, 1912
- Diastylis sympterygiae Băcescu & Lima de Quieroz, 1985
- Diastylis tenebricosa Jones, 1969
- Diastylis tenuicauda Lomakina, 1967
- Diastylis tetradon Lomakina, 1955
- Diastylis tongoyensis Gergen & Watling, 1998
- Diastylis tricincta (Zimmer, 1903)
- Diastylis tumida (Liljeborg, 1855)
- Diastylis umatillensis Lie, 1971
- Diastylis utinomii Gamo, 1968
- Diastylis vemae Băcescu, 1961
- Diastylis zimmeri Ledoyer, 1977
