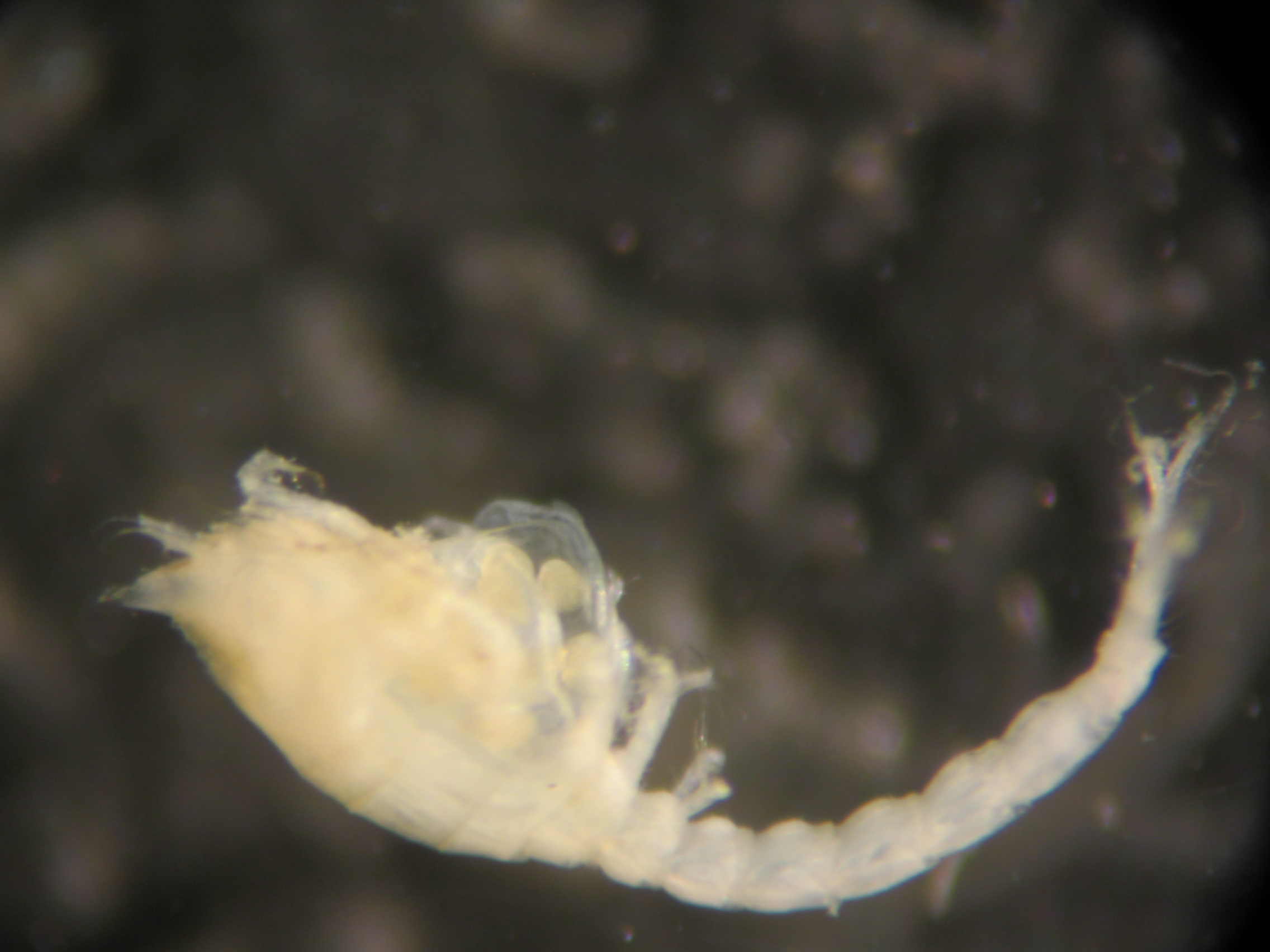
- Nippoleucon hinumensis

Scientific classification
- Domain: Eukaryota
- Kingdom: Animalia
- Phylum: Arthropoda
- Class: Malacostraca
- Order: Cumacea
- Family: Leuconidae
- Genus: Nippoleucon; Watling, 1991

= Nippoleucon =

Genus of crustaceans

Nippoleucon is a genus of hooded shrimps within the family Leuconidae, with 3 species currently assigned to the genus.

== Species ==
- Nippoleucon enoshimensis (Gamo, 1967)
- Nippoleucon hinumensis (Gamo, 1967)
- Nippoleucon projectus Lee & Lee, 2006
