= Dimorphostylis =

Scientific classification
- Domain: Eukaryota
- Kingdom: Animalia
- Phylum: Arthropoda
- Class: Malacostraca
- Order: Cumacea
- Family: Diastylidae
- Genus: Dimorphostylis; Zimmer, 1921

Species
- See text

Genus of crustaceans

Dimorphostylis is a genus of crustaceans from the Diastylidae family. The scientific name of this species was first published in 1921 by Zimmer.

== Species ==
The following species are accepted within Dimorphostylis:

- Dimorphostylis acroplicata Harada, 1960
- Dimorphostylis asiatica Zimmer, 1908
- Dimorphostylis australis Foxon, 1932
- Dimorphostylis bathyelegans Akiyama, 2011
- Dimorphostylis brevicarpus Akiyama, 2011
- Dimorphostylis brevicaudata (Zimmer, 1903)
- Dimorphostylis colefaxi Hale, 1945
- Dimorphostylis cornigera Harada, 1960
- Dimorphostylis coronata Gamo, 1960
- Dimorphostylis cottoni Hale, 1936
- Dimorphostylis echinata Gamo, 1962
- Dimorphostylis elegans Gamo, 1960
- Dimorphostylis gibbosa Harada, 1960
- Dimorphostylis hirsuta Gamo, 1960
- Dimorphostylis horai Kurian, 1956
- Dimorphostylis inauspicata Hale, 1945
- Dimorphostylis latifrons Harada, 1960
- Dimorphostylis longicauda Gamo, 1962
- Dimorphostylis longitelson Kurian, 1963
- Dimorphostylis maledivensis Mühlenhardt-Siegel, 1996
- Dimorphostylis manazuruensis Gamo, 1960
- Dimorphostylis namhaedoensis Lin & Lee, 2002
- Dimorphostylis nordaustraliana Gerken, 2014
- Dimorphostylis quadriplicata Gamo, 1960
- Dimorphostylis roccatagliatai Gerken, 2014
- Dimorphostylis sculpturensis Vassilenko & Tzareva, 1990
- Dimorphostylis subaculeata Hale, 1945
- Dimorphostylis tasmanica Hale, 1945
- Dimorphostylis tribulis Hale, 1945
- Dimorphostylis triplicata Gerken, 2014
- Dimorphostylis valida Harada, 1960
- Dimorphostylis vieta (Hale, 1936)
