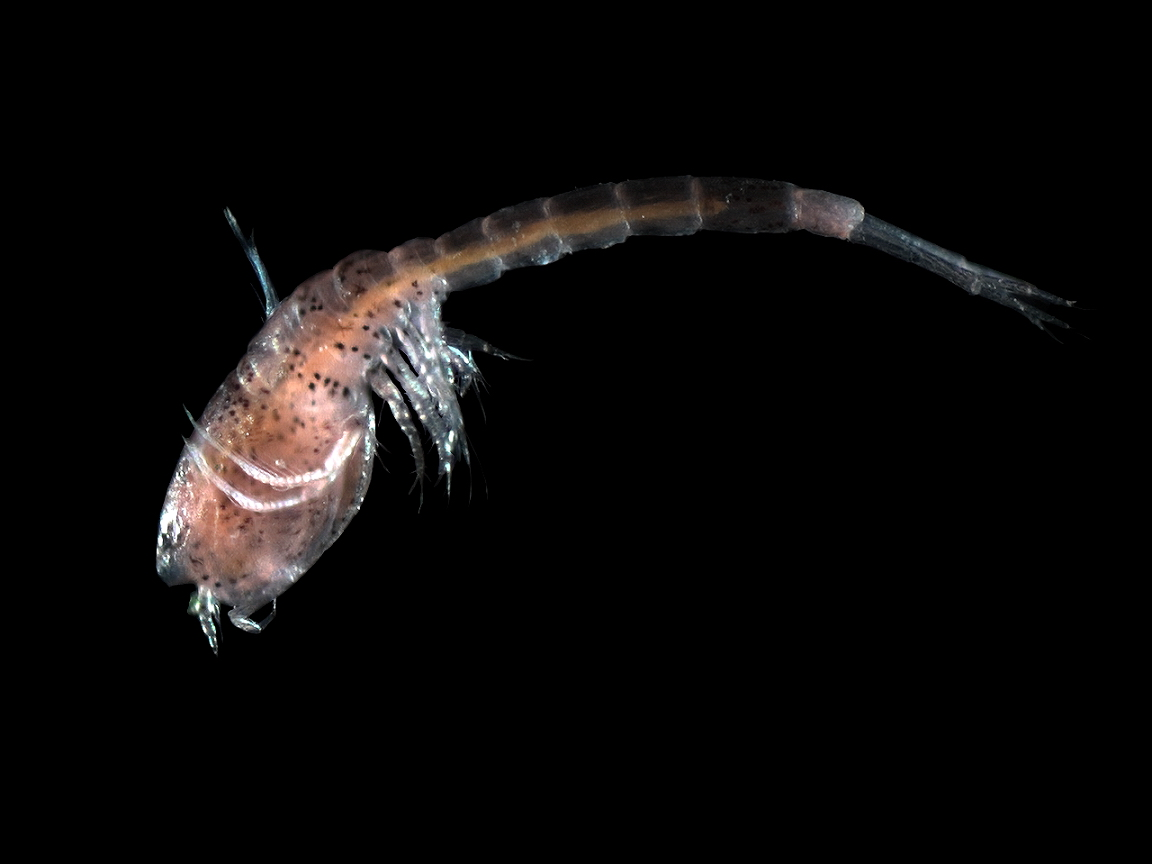
- Cumopsis goodsir

Scientific classification
- Domain: Eukaryota
- Kingdom: Animalia
- Phylum: Arthropoda
- Class: Malacostraca
- Order: Cumacea
- Family: Bodotriidae
- Subfamily: Vaunthompsoniinae
- Genus: Cumopsis; G.O. Sars, 1878

= Cumopsis =

Genus of crustaceans

Cumopsis is a genus of crustaceans in the family Bodotriidae originally described by G.O. Sars in 1878, the type species is Cumopsis goodsir (Van Beneden, 1861).

== Species ==
The following species are accepted on WoRMS as of October 2023:

- Cumopsis africanum (Zimmer, 1920)
- Cumopsis ambrizetensis (Bochert & Zettler, 2011)
- Cumopsis andamani (Kurian, 1954)
- Cumopsis armatum (Kurian, 1954)
- Cumopsis elongata Jones, 1956
- Cumopsis fagei Băcescu, 1956
- Cumopsis goodsir (Van Beneden, 1861)
- Cumopsis inerme (Corbera, Tirado & Martin, 2005)
- Cumopsis jonesi Le Loeuff & Intes, 1972
- Cumopsis longipes (Dohrn, 1869)
- Cumopsis robusta Day, 1975
- Cumopsis sarsi (Miers, 1879)
- Cumopsis wafri Jones, 1956
