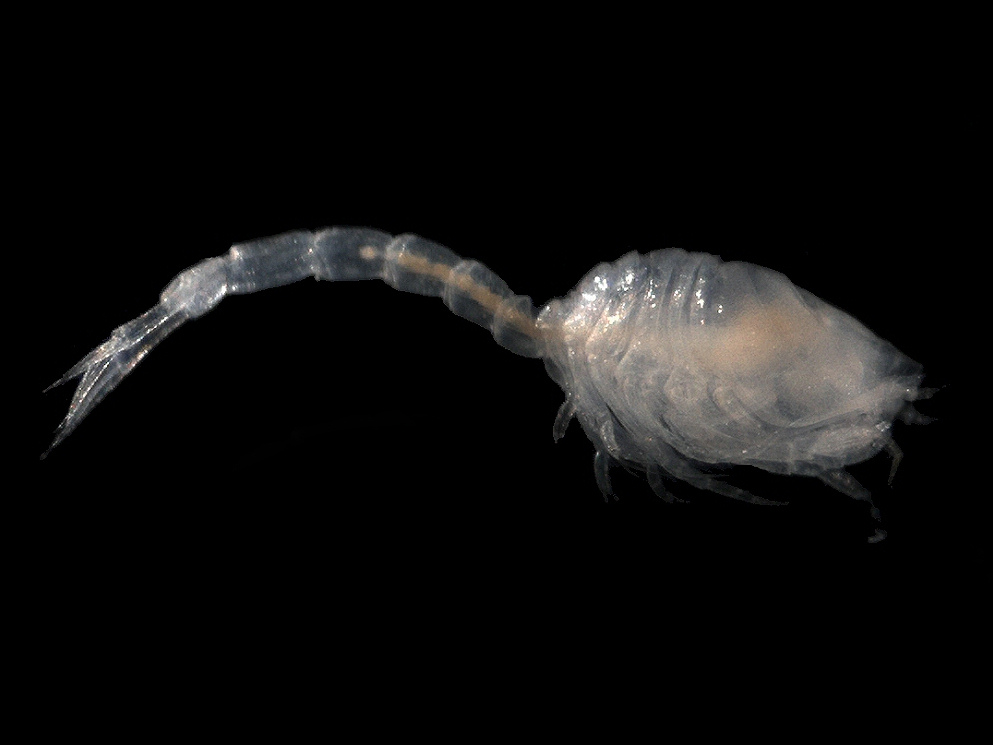

Scientific classification
- Domain: Eukaryota
- Kingdom: Animalia
- Phylum: Arthropoda
- Class: Malacostraca
- Order: Cumacea
- Family: Pseudocumatidae
- Genus: Pseudocuma
- Species: P. longicorne

Binomial name
- Pseudocuma longicorne (Spence Bate, 1858)

= Pseudocuma longicorne =

Species of crustacean

Pseudocuma longicorne is a marine species of cumacean in the family Pseudocumatidae.
