= Ceratocumatidae =

Scientific classification
- Kingdom: Animalia
- Phylum: Arthropoda
- Clade: Pancrustacea
- Class: Malacostraca
- Order: Cumacea
- Family: Ceratocumatidae; Calman, 1905

Genera
- Ceratocuma; Cimmerius

Family of crustaceans

Ceratocumatidae is a family of crustaceans of the order Cumacea. Ceratocumatidae have a small free telson. The endopods (interior branches) of the uropods are present on only one segment. Males have 5, 4 or 3 pairs of pleopods. All maxillipeds and some of the pereiopods bear exopods (outer branches). The gill apparatus has no supporting gill plates.
