= Cyclaspis =

Scientific classification
- Domain: Eukaryota
- Kingdom: Animalia
- Phylum: Arthropoda
- Class: Malacostraca
- Order: Cumacea
- Family: Bodotriidae
- Subfamily: Bodotriinae
- Genus: Cyclaspis; Sars, 1865

Species
- See text

Genus of crustaceans

Cyclaspis is a genus of cumacean crustaceans in the subfamily Bodotriinae, containing the following species:

- Cyclaspis adiastolos Corbera, Tirado & Martin, 2005
- Cyclaspis affinis Lomakina, 1968
- Cyclaspis agrenosculpta Tafe & Greenwood, 1996
- Cyclaspis alba Roccatagliata, 1986
- Cyclaspis alveosculpta Tafe & Greenwood, 1996
- Cyclaspis amamiensis Gamo, 1963
- Cyclaspis andersoni Tafe & Greenwood, 1996
- Cyclaspis antipai Petrescu, 1995
- Cyclaspis argus Zimmer, 1902
- Cyclaspis aspera Hale, 1944
- Cyclaspis australis Sars, 1887
- Cyclaspis australora Day, 1978
- Cyclaspis bacescui Omholt & Heard, 1982
- Cyclaspis bengalensis Kurian, 1954
- Cyclaspis bicornis Zimmer, 1921
- Cyclaspis bidens Gamo, 1962
- Cyclaspis bituberculata Donath-Hernandez, 1988
- Cyclaspis bovis Hale, 1928
- Cyclaspis breedyae Petrescu & Heard, 2004
- Cyclaspis brevipes Hale, 1948
- Cyclaspis cana Hale, 1944
- Cyclaspis candida Zimmer, 1921
- Cyclaspis candidoides Bacescu, 1992
- Cyclaspis caprella Hale, 1936
- Cyclaspis chaunosculpta Tafe & Greenwood, 1996
- Cyclaspis cheveyi Fage, 1945
- Cyclaspis cingulata Calman, 1907
- Cyclaspis clarki Hale, 1944
- Cyclaspis coelebs Calman, 1917
- Cyclaspis concepcionensis Donath-Hernandez, 1988
- Cyclaspis concinna Hale, 1944
- Cyclaspis cooki Tafe & Greenwood, 1996
- Cyclaspis costata Calman, 1904
- Cyclaspis cottoni Hale, 1937
- Cyclaspis cretata Hale, 1944
- Cyclaspis cristulata Gamo, 1987
- Cyclaspis daviei Tafe & Greenwood, 1996
- Cyclaspis dentifrons Zimmer, 1944
- Cyclaspis dolera Zimmer, 1944
- Cyclaspis elegans Calman, 1907
- Cyclaspis exsculpta Sars, 1886
- Cyclaspis formosae Zimmer, 1921
- Cyclaspis fulgida Hale, 1944
- Cyclaspis gezamuelleri Petrescu, 1998
- Cyclaspis gibba Hale, 1944
- Cyclaspis gigas Zimmer, 1907
- Cyclaspis globosa Hale, 1944
- Cyclaspis goesii (Sars, 1871)
- Cyclaspis goytacazes Brito & Serejo, 2020
- Cyclaspis gracialis Hansen, 1908
- Cyclaspis granulata (Radha Devi & Kurian, 1981)
- Cyclaspis granulosa Hale, 1944
- Cyclaspis herdmani Calman, 1904
- Cyclaspis hornelli Calman, 1904
- Cyclaspis indoaustralica Bacescu, 1992
- Cyclaspis iorgui Ortiz & Lalana, 2002
- Cyclaspis iphinoides Bacescu & Muradian, 1975
- Cyclaspis jamaicensis Petrescu, Illiffe, Sarbu, 1993
- Cyclaspis jonesi Roccatagliata, 1985
- Cyclaspis juxta Hale, 1948
- Cyclaspis kensleyi Petrescu, 2002
- Cyclaspis kerguelenensis Ledoyer, 1977
- Cyclaspis levis Thomson, 1892
- Cyclaspis lilianae Brito & Serejo, 2020
- Cyclaspis linguiloba Liu & Liu, 1990
- Cyclaspis lissa Muhlenhardt-Siegel, 2003
- Cyclaspis longicaudata Sars, 1865
- Cyclaspis longipes Calman, 1907
- Cyclaspis lucida Hale, 1944
- Cyclaspis marisrubri Bacescu & Muradian, 1975
- Cyclaspis mawsonae Hale, 1944
- Cyclaspis mexicansis (Radha Devi & Kurian, 1981)
- Cyclaspis micans Roccatagliata, 1985
- Cyclaspis mihaibacescui Petrescu, 2008
- Cyclaspis mjoebergi Zimmer, 1921
- Cyclaspis mollis Hale, 1944
- Cyclaspis munda Hale, 1944
- Cyclaspis nalbanti Petrescu, 1998
- Cyclaspis nitida Hale, 1944
- Cyclaspis nubila Zimmer, 1936
- Cyclaspis ornosculpta Tafe & Greenwood, 1996
- Cyclaspis oxyura Roccatagliata & Moreira, 1987
- Cyclaspis perelegans Roccatagliata & Moreira, 1987
- Cyclaspis persculpta Calman, 1905
- Cyclaspis peruana Zimmer, 1943
- Cyclaspis picta Calman, 1904
- Cyclaspis pinguis Hale, 1944
- Cyclaspis platymerus Zimmer, 1944
- Cyclaspis popescugorji Petrescu, 1998
- Cyclaspis prolifica Bacescu, 1990
- Cyclaspis pruinosa Hale, 1944
- Cyclaspis pura Hale, 1936
- Cyclaspis purpurascens Gamo, 1964
- Cyclaspis pusilla Sars, 1886
- Cyclaspis pustulata Zimmer, 1943
- Cyclaspis quadrituberculata Zimmer, 1907
- Cyclaspis quadruplicata Kurian, 1951
- Cyclaspis reticulata Roccatagliata, 1985
- Cyclaspis roccatagliatae Petrescu, 1995
- Cyclaspis rudis Hale, 1948
- Cyclaspis sabulosa Hale, 1944
- Cyclaspis sallai Tafe & Greenwood, 1996
- Cyclaspis scissa Day, 1978
- Cyclaspis sculptilis Roccatagliata, 1989
- Cyclaspis sheardi Hale, 1944
- Cyclaspis sibogae Calman, 1905
- Cyclaspis similis Calman, 1907
- Cyclaspis simonae Petrescu, Illiffe, Sarbu, 1993
- Cyclaspis simula Hale, 1944
- Cyclaspis spectabilis Zimmer, 1908
- Cyclaspis spilotes Hale, 1928
- Cyclaspis sterreri Petrescu, 2002
- Cyclaspis stocki Bacescu, 1990
- Cyclaspis striata Roccatagliata & Moreira, 1987
- Cyclaspis strigilis Hale, 1944
- Cyclaspis strumosa Hale, 1948
- Cyclaspis subgrandis Jones, 1969
- Cyclaspis sublevis Hale, 1948
- Cyclaspis supersculpta Zimmer, 1921
- Cyclaspis tasmanica Jones, 1969
- Cyclaspis tesauna Brito & Serejo, 2020
- Cyclaspis testudinum Zimmer, 1943
- Cyclaspis thomsoni Calman, 1907
- Cyclaspis tranteri Tafe & Greenwood, 1996
- Cyclaspis tribulis Hale, 1928
- Cyclaspis triplicata Calman, 1907
- Cyclaspis unicornis Calman, 1907
- Cyclaspis uniplicata Calman, 1907
- Cyclaspis ursulae Muhlenhardt-Siegel, 2003
- Cyclaspis usitata Hale, 1932
- Cyclaspis vargasae Petrescu & Heard, 2004
- Cyclaspis variabilis Roccatagliata, 1986
- Cyclaspis varians Calman, 1912
