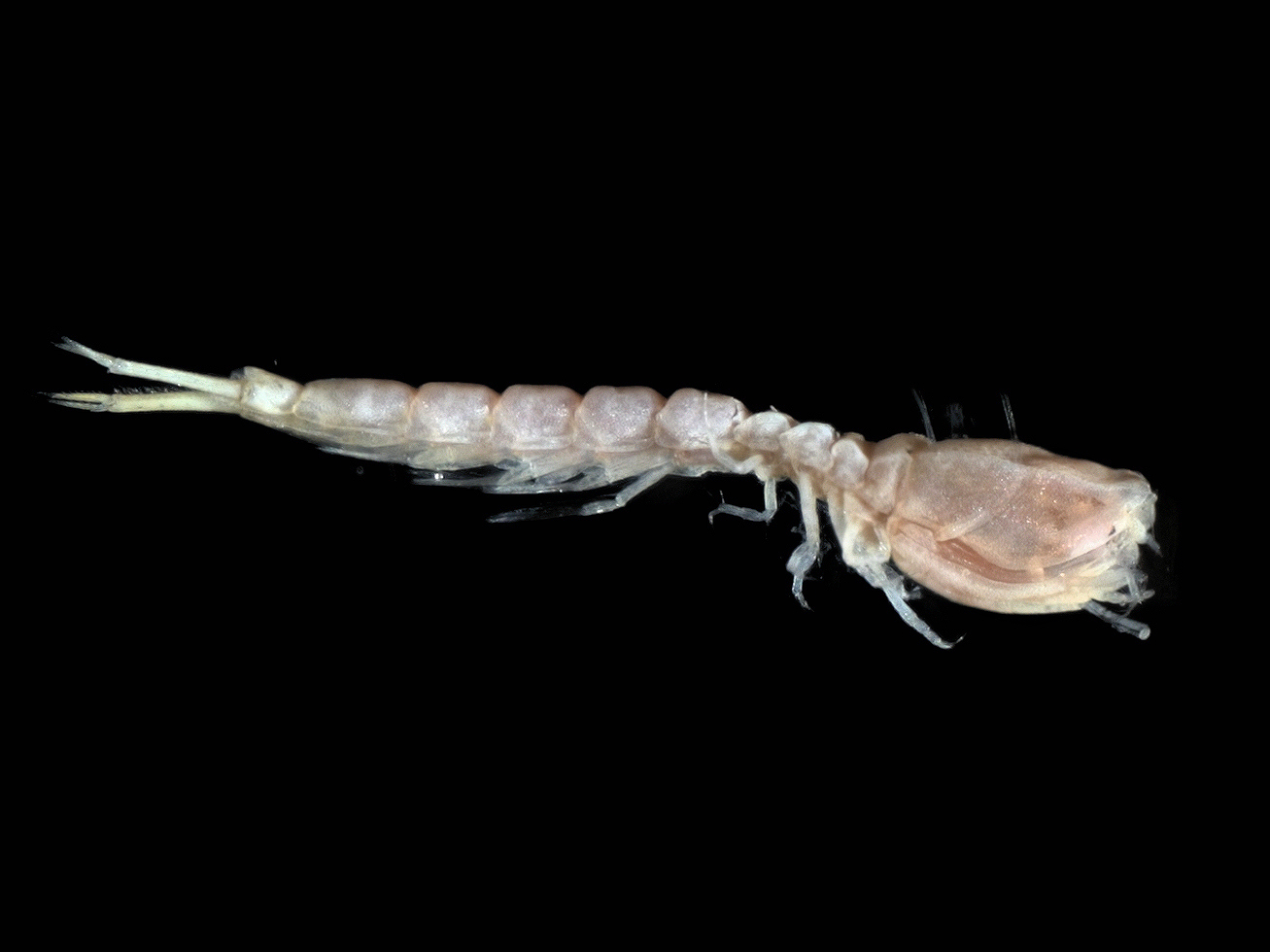
- Male Bodotria scorpioides
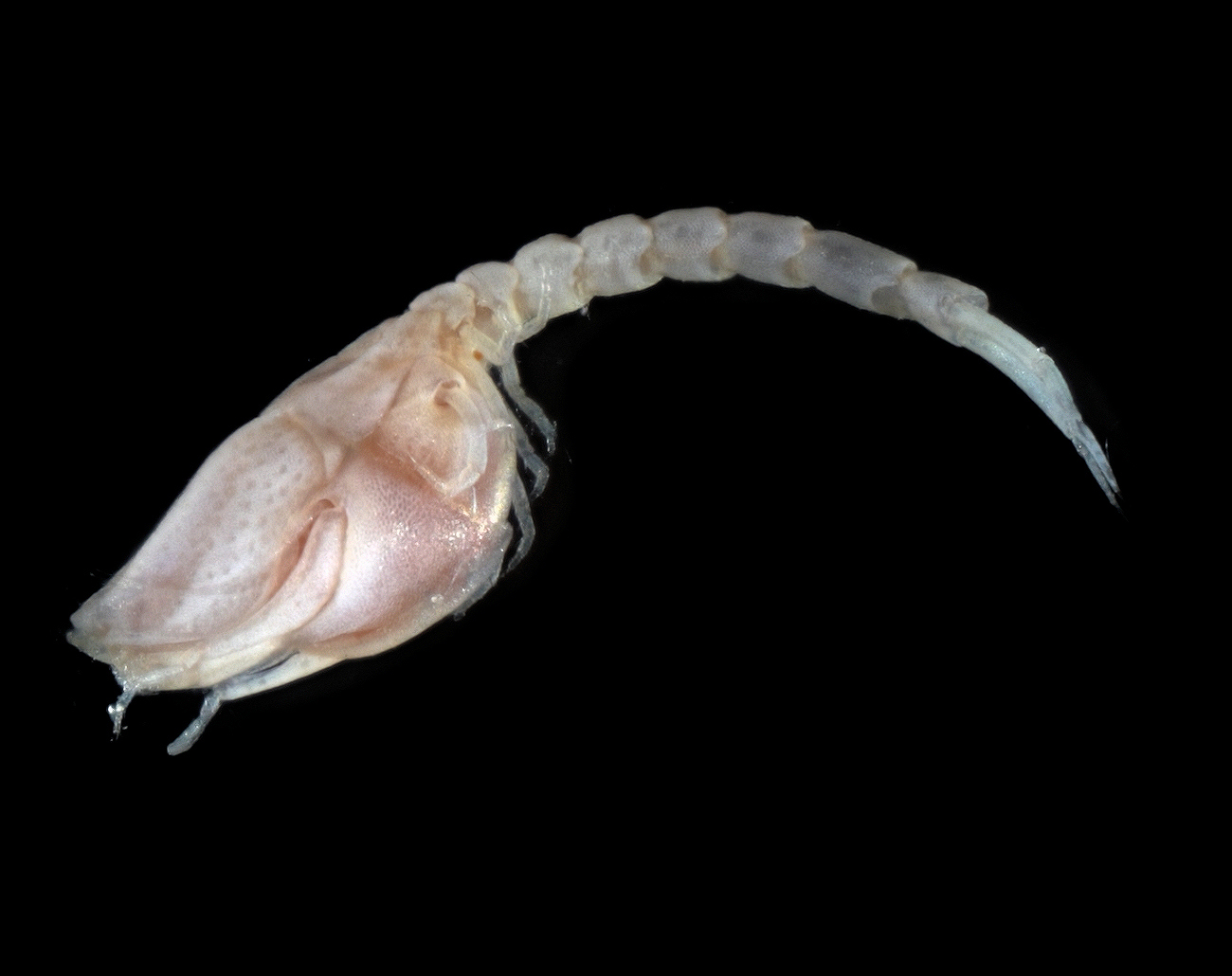
- Female Bodotria scorpioides

Scientific classification
- Domain: Eukaryota
- Kingdom: Animalia
- Phylum: Arthropoda
- Class: Malacostraca
- Order: Cumacea
- Family: Bodotriidae
- Genus: Bodotria
- Species: B. scorpioides

Binomial name
- Bodotria scorpioides (Montagu, 1804)

= Bodotria scorpioides =

Species of crustacean

Bodotria scorpioides is a species of crustacean belonging to the order Cumacea. They are found in the East Atlantic, the Mediterranean and the Black Sea. B. scorpioides does not possess a free telson. The first thoracic somite is too short to be seen from above, the second is longer. Both males and females have exopods (outer branches) on the first pereopods only.
