= Lampropidae =

Scientific classification
- Domain: Eukaryota
- Kingdom: Animalia
- Phylum: Arthropoda
- Class: Malacostraca
- Order: Cumacea
- Family: Lampropidae; Sars, 1878

Genera
- Archaeocuma; Bathylamprops; Chalarostylis; Hemilamprops; Lamprops; Mesolamprops; Murilamprops; Paralamprops; Platysympus; Platytyphlops; Pseudodiastylis; Pseudolamprops; Stenotyphlops; Typolamprops; Watlinga

Family of crustaceans

Lampropidae is a family of cold-water crustaceans belonging to the order Cumacea. Members of Lampropidae are relatively easily recognised because they all at have at least three terminal setae on the telson (rigid fibres on the end of the tail). The telson is medium to large and not fused with the last segment of the pleon. The endopods (interior branches) of the uropods are present on all three members. In the males the flagellum of the second antenna reaches beyond the carapace; moreover, they possess pleopods. In the females the second antenna is somewhat shorter than the first. There are exopods (outer branches) on the third maxilliped and strongly reduced or absent on the third pereopods.
