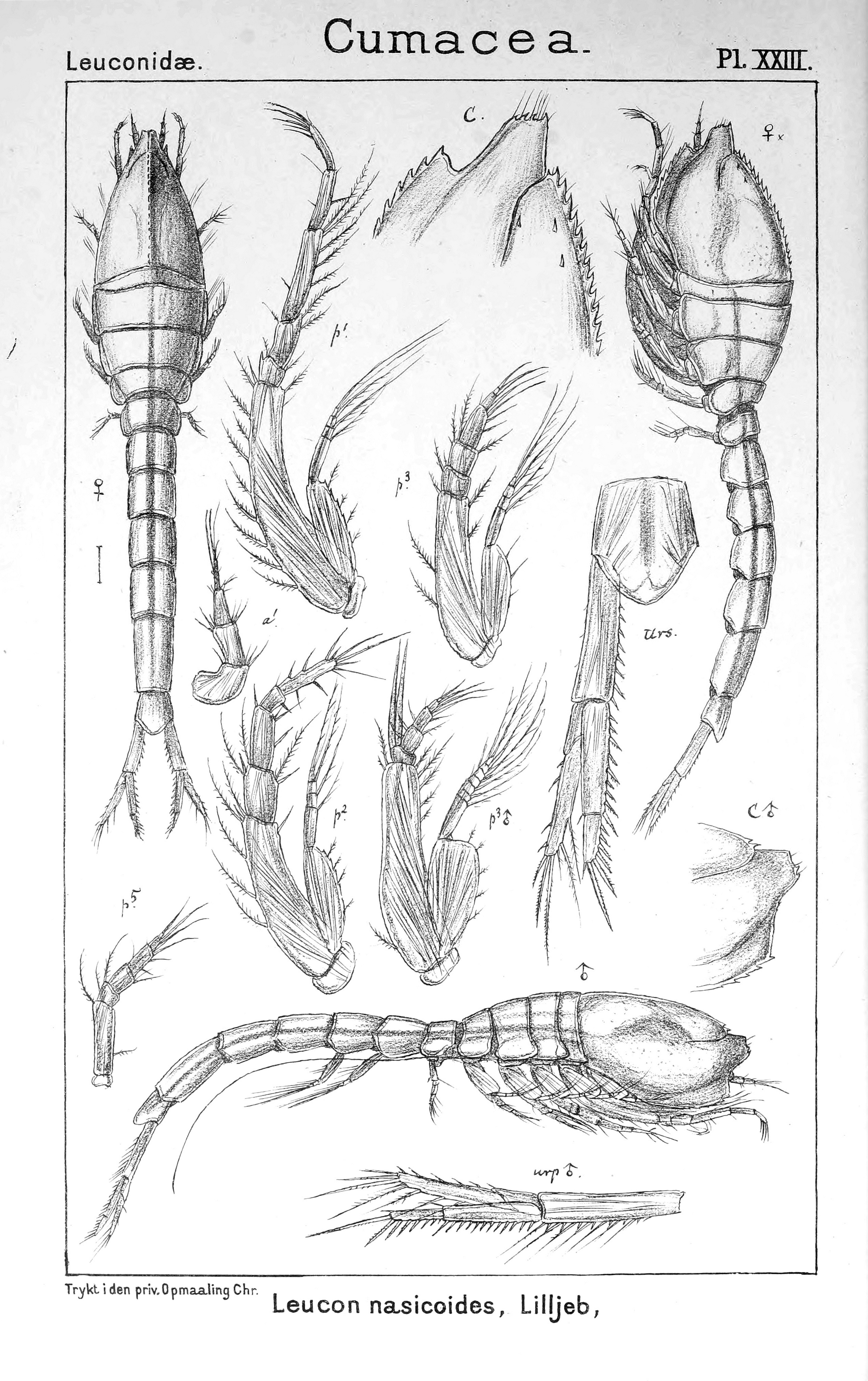
- Leucon nasicoides

Scientific classification
- Kingdom: Animalia
- Phylum: Arthropoda
- Clade: Pancrustacea
- Class: Malacostraca
- Order: Cumacea
- Family: Leuconidae; Sars, 1878

Genera
- See text

= Leuconidae =

Family of crustaceans

Leuconidae is a family of marine hooded shrimp (order Cumacea). The family was established by Georg Ossian Sars in his 1878 study of Mediterranean cumaceans.

== Description ==
Leuconidae retain the original number of free thoracic somites, but do not possess a free telson. Their mandibles are truncated dorsally to the molar. In males, the flagellum of the second antenna reaches beyond the hindmost edge of the carapace. Their gills do not have gill plates or other supports.

The endopods (interior branches) of the uropods are present on two (or more rarely one) segments. The males of almost all Leuconidae also have pleopods, typically two pairs that lack an external process on the inner ramus. In females the second antenna is greatly reduced. They have exopods (outer branches) on the maxillipeds and on the first two pereiopods, in females of some species often also on the third, and in the males of most species also on the third and fourth.

== Genera ==
There 17 recognized genera:

- Abyssoleucon Lavrenteva & Mühlenhardt-Siegel, 2015
- Afroleucon Mühlenhardt-Siegel, 2011
- Alloeoleucon Watling & McCann, 1997
- Austroleucon Watling, 1991
- Bytholeucon Jones, 1991
- Eudorella Norman, 1867
- Eudorellopsis Sars, 1882
- Hemileucon Calman, 1907
- Heteroleucon Calman, 1907
- Ithyleucon Corbera, 2012
- Kontiloleucon Gerken, 2016
- Leucon Krøyer, 1846
- Nippoleucon Watling, 1991
- Ommatoleucon Watling, 1991
- Paraleucon Calman, 1907
- Phalloleucon Mühlenhardt-Siegel, 2008
- Pseudoleucon Zimmer, 1903
