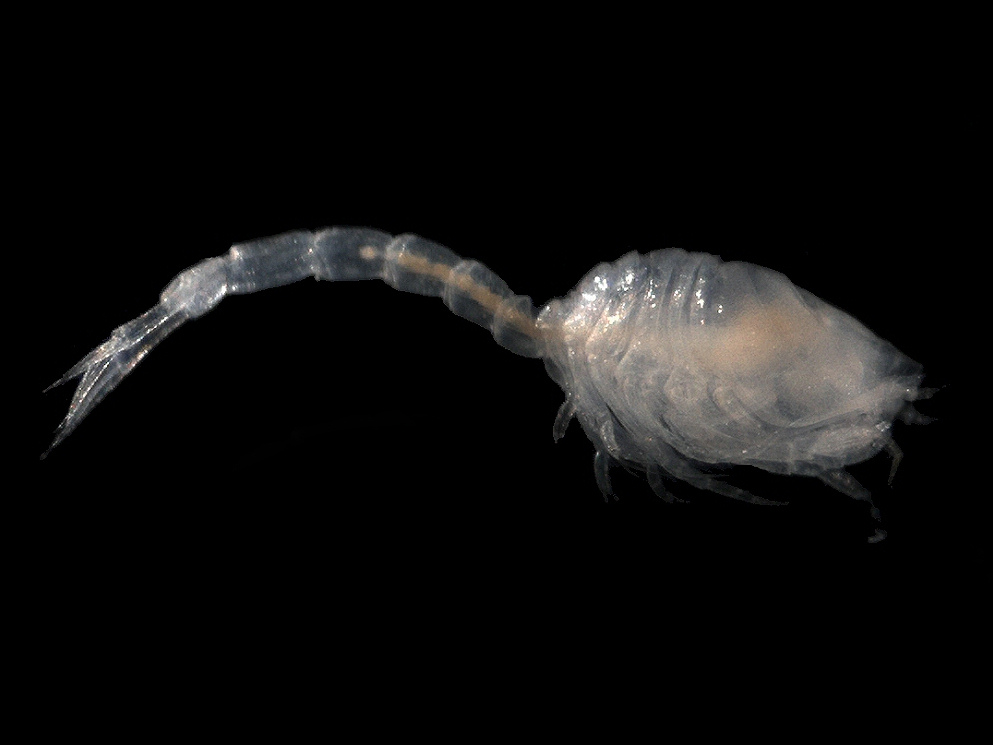
- Pseudocuma longicorne

Scientific classification
- Domain: Eukaryota
- Kingdom: Animalia
- Phylum: Arthropoda
- Class: Malacostraca
- Order: Cumacea
- Family: Pseudocumatidae; G. O. Sars, 1878

Genera
- Carinocuma; Caspiocuma; Chasarocuma; Fontainella; Hyrcanocuma; Kerguelenica; Monopseudocuma; Petalosarsia; Pseudocuma; Pterocuma; Schizorhamphus; Strauchia; Volgacuma

= Pseudocumatidae =

Family of crustaceans

Pseudocumatidae is a family of crustaceans of the order Cumacea. Its members have a small, free telson. The uropods bear endopods (interior branch) on one segment. The males have two pairs of rather rudimentary pleopods and the flagella of the second antenna reach far beyond the pereon. In females the second antenna is much smaller than the first antenna.
