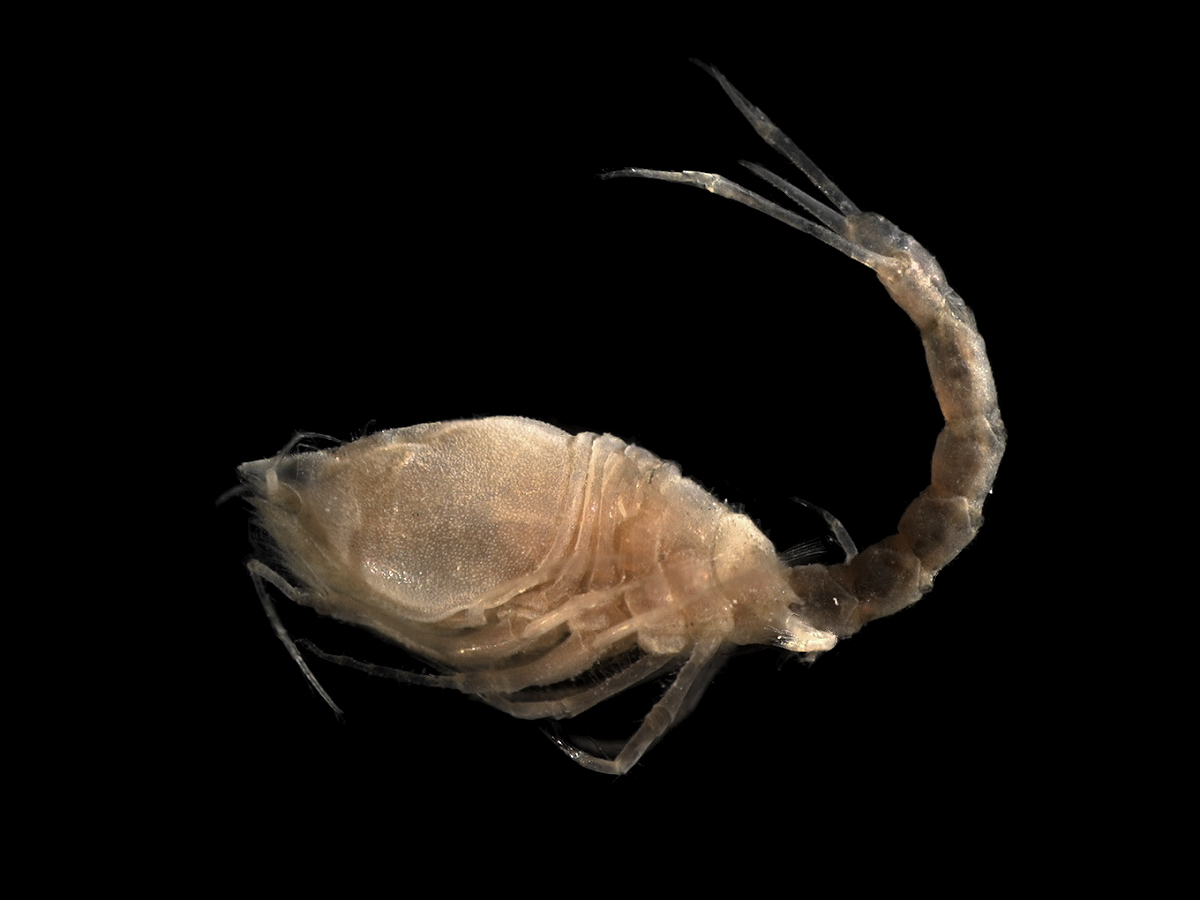
- Diastylis laevis

Scientific classification
- Domain: Eukaryota
- Kingdom: Animalia
- Phylum: Arthropoda
- Class: Malacostraca
- Order: Cumacea
- Family: Diastylidae; Bate, 1856

Genera
- See text

= Diastylidae =

Family of crustaceans

Diastylidae is one of the eight most commonly recognised families of crustaceans of the order Cumacea. They are marine creatures especially common around the 30th parallel north.

== Anatomy ==
General body plan of diastylids, based on D. laevis

Diastylidae have a medium to large, free telson, that has not fused with the last pleon segment. The telson usually bears two terminal setae.

Males have generally two pairs of pleopods, though in rare cases they may be rather small or even entirely absent. The flagellum of the second antenna reaches past the pereon.

In females the second antenna is much smaller than the first antenna. In males the third maxilliped and the first four pereiopods almost always have exopods (outer branches). In females they may, in rare cases, be absent from all but the third maxillipeds, and the two first pereiopods.

The interior branch of the uropods are generally made up of two or three segments, but in some rare case may have just one. Members of this family frequently show clear sexual dimorphism.

== Genera ==
There are around 285 species, in 24 genera:

- Anchicolurus Stebbing, 1912
- Anchistylis Hole, 1945
- Atlantistylis Reyss, 1975
- Brachydiastylis Stebbing, 1912
- Colurostylis Calman, 1911
- Cuma Milne-Edwards, 1828
- Diastylis Say, 1818
- Diastyloides G. O. Sars, 1900
- Diastylopsis Smith, 1880
- Dic Stebbing, 1910
- Dimorphostylis Zimmer, 1921
- Divacuma
- Ekleptostylis Stebbing, 1912
- Ektonodiastylis Gerken, Watling & Klitgaard, 2000
- Geyserius
- Holostylis Stebbing, 1912
- Leptostylis G. O. Sars, 1869
- Leptostyloides
- Makrokylindrus Stebbing, 1912
- Oxyurostylis Calman, 1912
- Pachystylis Hansen, 1895
- Paradiastylis Calman, 1904
- Paraleptostylis Vassilenko, 1990
- Vemakylindrus Bacescu, 1961
