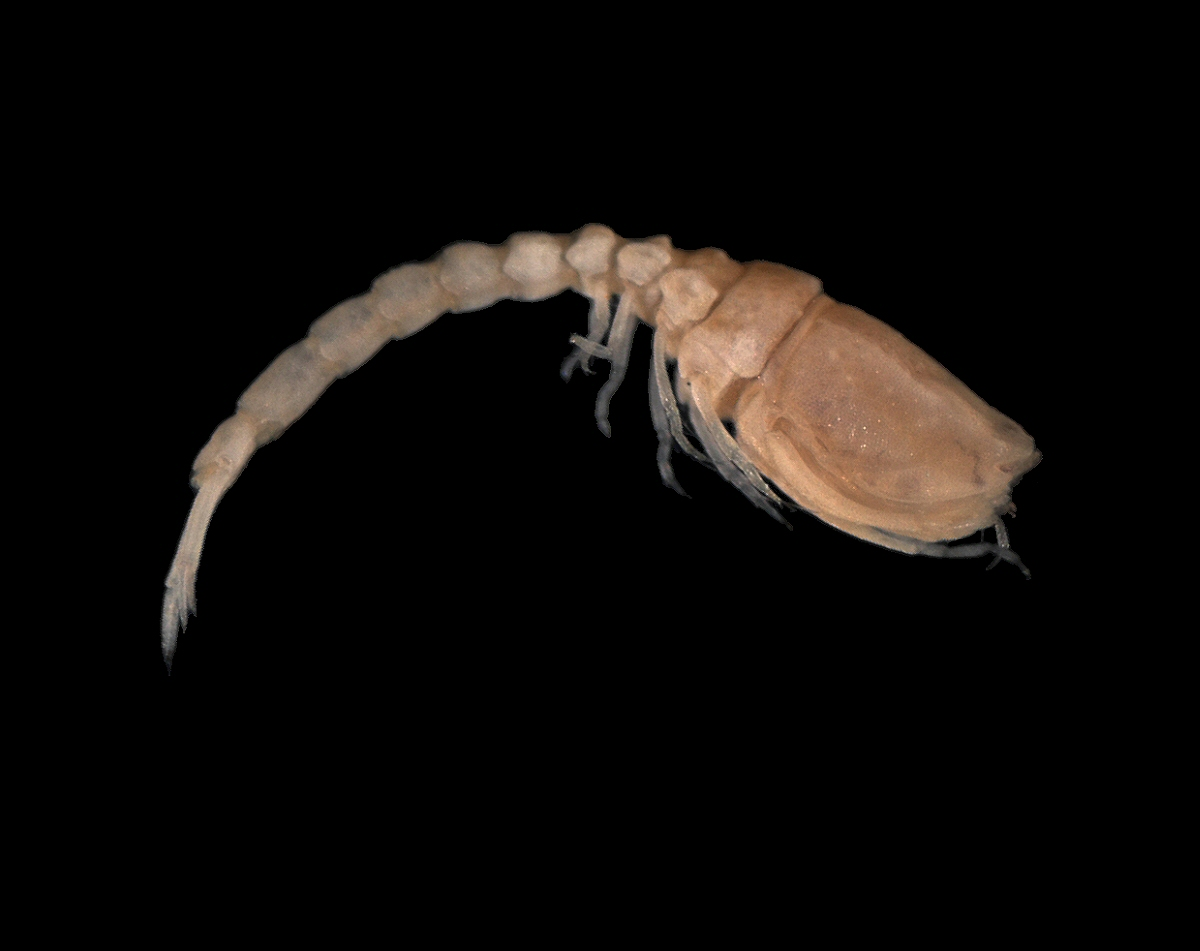
- Bodotria scorpioides

Scientific classification
- Domain: Eukaryota
- Kingdom: Animalia
- Phylum: Arthropoda
- Class: Malacostraca
- Order: Cumacea
- Family: Bodotriidae; T. Scott, 1901

Subfamilies
- Bodotriinae; Vaunthompsoniinae; Mancocumatinae

= Bodotriidae =

Family of crustaceans

Bodotriidae is a family of crustaceans belonging to the order Cumacea. Bodotriids have a worldwide distribution in shallow and deep waters. There are over 380 described species in over 30 genera, being the most diverse cumacean family. Their external morphology differs from other cumaceans by a combination of traits that independently are not unique to the family: the telson is fused to the last abdominal segment (last pleonite), the dorsal part of the mandible has a boat shape (naviculoid), exopods exist on the third maxilliped and the first peraeopod, and there is a uropodal endopod with one or two articles.

== Anatomy ==
In both sexes the telson is fused with the last segment of the pleon, forming a "pleotelson". Males generally have five pairs of pleopods, although less often there may be three, two or they may be entirely absent. In females the second antenna is substantially shorter than the first. The third maxillipeds always have exopods (outer branches), and there are endopods (inner branches) on one or two segments of the uropods.

== Diversity ==
Bodotriidae is divided into three subfamilies (Bodotriinae, Mancocumatinae, and Vaunthompsoniinae), although it has been suggested that Mancocumatinae belong to the Vaunthompsoniinae:

Bodotriinae Scott, 1901

- Alticuma Day, 1978
- Apocuma Jones, 1973
- Atlantocuma Bacescu & Muradian, 1974
- Austrocuma Day, 1978
- Bacescuma Petrescu, 1998
- Bodotria Goodsir, 1843
- Cyclaspis Sars, 1865
- Cyclaspoides Bonnier, 1896
- Eocuma Marcusen, 1894
- Iphinoe Bate, 1856
- Mossambicuma Day, 1978
- Pseudocyclaspis Edwards, 1984
- Stephanomma Sars, 1871
- Upselaspis Jones, 1955
- Zygosiphon Calman, 1907

Mancocumatinae Watling, 1977

- Mancocuma Zimmer, 1943
- Pseudoleptocuma Watling, 1977
- Speleocuma
- Spilocuma Watling, 1977

Vaunthompsoniinae

- Bathycuma Hansen, 1895
- Cumopsis G. O. Sars, 1865
- Gaussicuma Zimmer, 1907
- Gephyrocuma Hale, 1936
- Gigacuma Kurian, 1951
- Glyphocuma Hale, 1944
- Heterocuma Miers, 1879
- Hypocuma Jones, 1973
- Leptocuma Sars, 1873
- Paravaunthompsonia Mühlenhardt-Siegel, 2008
- Picrocuma Hale, 1936
- Pomacuma Hale, 1944
- Pseudosympodomma Kurian, 1954
- Scyllarocuma
- Sympodomma Stebbing, 1912
- Vaunthompsonia Bate, 1858
- Zenocuma Hale, 1944
