= Gynodiastylidae =

Scientific classification
- Kingdom: Animalia
- Phylum: Arthropoda
- Class: Malacostraca
- Order: Cumacea
- Family: Gynodiastylidae; Stebbing, 1912

Genera
- Allodiastylis Gerken, 2001; Axiogynodiastylis Gerken, 2001; Jennidayus Zhang, Gerken & Chen, 2014; Dicoides Hale, 1946; Eogynodiastylis Gerken, 2001; Gynodiastylis Calman, 1911; Haliana Day, 1980; Litogynodiastylis Gerken, 2001; Paradicoides Gerken, 2001; Pseudozimmeriana Gerken, 2001; Sheardia Hale, 1946; Zimmeriana Hale, 1946

Family of crustaceans

Gynodiastylidae is one of the eight most commonly recognised families of crustaceans of the order Cumacea. They are especially prevalent in the Southern Hemisphere, with some types described from Japan, Thailand and the Persian Gulf. Most are found at less than 100 metres (330 ft) depth.

== Anatomy ==
Gynodiastylidae have a small free telson, usually lacking terminal setae, though in some cases there may be two. The interior branch (endopod) of the uropods is present on segments one through three. The number of free thoracic somites is never reduced. The first pereopods have a group of long rigid fibres (setae) on the propodus. Males have no pleopods. The flagellum of the second antenna does not reach further than the hindmost edge of the carapace. Females have a very small second antenna (much smaller than the first). They also have no exopods (outer branches) on their third maxillipeds. Because they lack exceptions to the two most important diagnostic characteristics (the lack of pleopods in males and of exopods on maxilliped 3 in females), Gynodiastylidae have a pre-eminent place among monographic descriptions.
