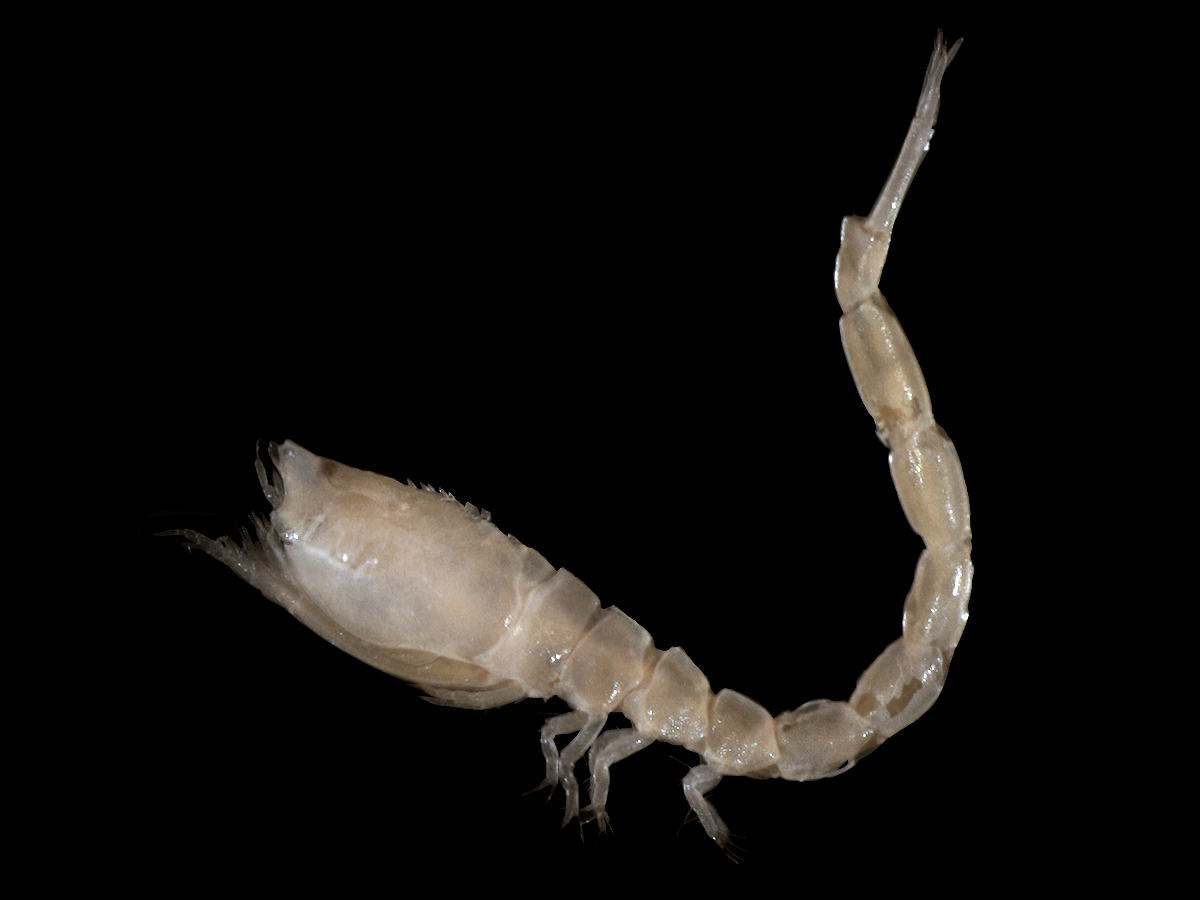
- Iphinoe trispinosa

Scientific classification
- Kingdom: Animalia
- Phylum: Arthropoda
- Clade: Pancrustacea
- Class: Malacostraca
- Superorder: Peracarida
- Order: Cumacea; Krøyer, 1846

Families
- 8, See taxonomy

= Cumacea =

Cumacea Temporal range: Mississippian–Recent

Order of crustacean

Cumacea is an order of small marine crustaceans of the superorder Peracarida, occasionally called hooded shrimp or comma shrimp. Their unique appearance and uniform body plan makes them easy to distinguish from other crustaceans. They live in soft bottoms such as mud and sand, mostly in the marine environment. There are more than 1,500 species of cumaceans formally described. The species diversity of Cumacea increases with depth.

== Anatomy ==
General body plan of a cumacean

Cumaceans have a strongly enlarged cephalothorax with a carapace, a slim abdomen, and a forked tail. The length of most species varies from 1 to 10 millimetres (0.04 to 0.39 in).

The carapace of a typical cumacean is composed of several fused dorsal head parts and the first three somites of the thorax. This carapace encloses the appendages that serve for respiration and feeding. In most species, there are two eyes at the front side of the head shield, often merged into a single dorsal eye lobe. The five posterior somites of the thorax form the pereon. The pleon (abdomen) consists of six cylindrical somites.

The first antenna (antennule) has two flagella, the outer flagellum usually being longer than the inner one. The second antenna is strongly reduced in females, and consists of numerous segments in males.

Cumaceans have six pairs of mouthparts: one pair of mandibles, one pair of maxillules, one pair of maxillae and three pairs of maxillipeds.

== Ecology ==
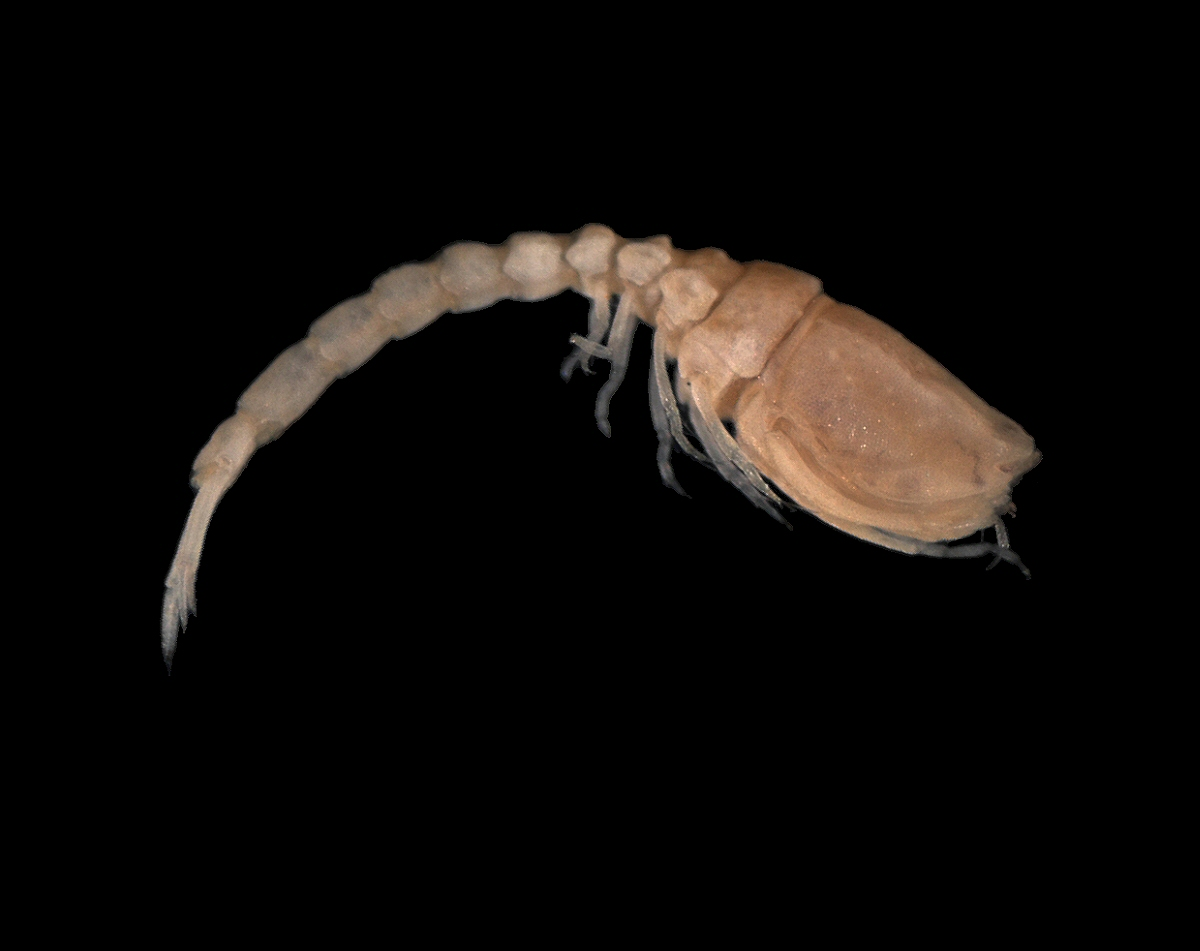
Bodotria scorpioides

Cumaceans are mainly marine crustaceans. However, some species can survive in water with a lower salinity, like brackish water (e.g. estuaries). In the Caspian Sea they even reach some rivers that flow into it. A few species live in the intertidal zone.

Most species live only one year or less, and reproduce twice in their lifetime. Deep-sea species have a slower metabolism and presumably live much longer.

Cumaceans feed mainly on microorganisms and organic material from the sediment. Species that live in the mud filter their food, while species that live in sand browse individual grains of sand. In the genus Campylaspis and a few related genera, the mandibles are transformed into piercing organs, which can be used for predation on foraminiferans and small crustaceans.

Many shallow-water species show a diurnal cycle, with males emerging from the sediment at night and swarming to the surface.

== Importance ==
Like Amphipoda, cumaceans are an important food source for many fishes. Therefore, they are an important part of the marine food chain. They can be found on all continents.

== Reproduction and development ==
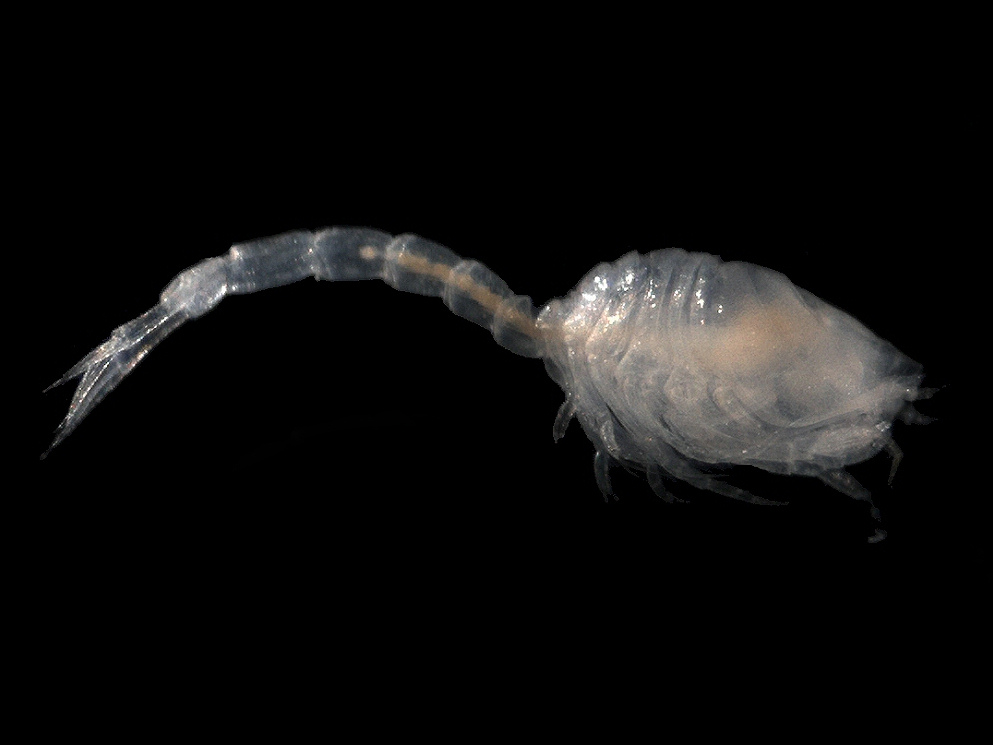
Pseudocuma longicorne

Cumaceans are a clear example of sexual dimorphism: males and females differ significantly in their appearance. Both sexes have different ornaments (setation, knobs, and ridges) on their carapace. Other differences are the length of the second antenna, the existence of pleopods in males, and the development of a marsupium (brood pouch) in females. There are generally more females than males, and females are also larger than their male counterparts.

Cumaceans are epimorphic, which means that the number of body segments does not change during development. This is a form of incomplete metamorphosis. Females carry the embryos in their marsupium for some time. The larvae leave the marsupium in the manca stage, in which they are almost fully grown and are only missing their last pair of pereiopods.

== History of research ==
The order Cumacea has been known since 1780, when Ivan Ivanovich Lepechin described the species "Oniscus scorpioides" (now Diastylis scorpioides). At the time, many scientists thought that the cumaceans were larval stages of decapods. In 1846, they were recognised as a separate order by Henrik Nikolaj Krøyer. Twenty-five years later, about fifty different species had been described, and currently there are more than 1,500 described species. The German zoologist Carl Wilhelm Erich Zimmer studied the order Cumacea very intensively.

== Fossil record ==
The fossil record of cumaceans is very sparse, but extends back into the Mississippian age. Fossil Cumaceans from the early Jurassic scarcely differ from living forms (Bacescu & Petrescu 1999).

Eobodotria muisca was found in 2019 in strata from the Middle Cretaceous of Colombia. Exceptional details such as the gut, mouth parts, pereopods, setae bearing uropods, antenna with developed flagella, and even small eyes with ommatidia were preserved. Eobodotria straddles a gap of almost 165 million years in the fossil record of sea commas, providing a reliable calibration point for phylogenetic studies. This species is considered the first certain representative of crown Cumacea.

== Taxonomy ==
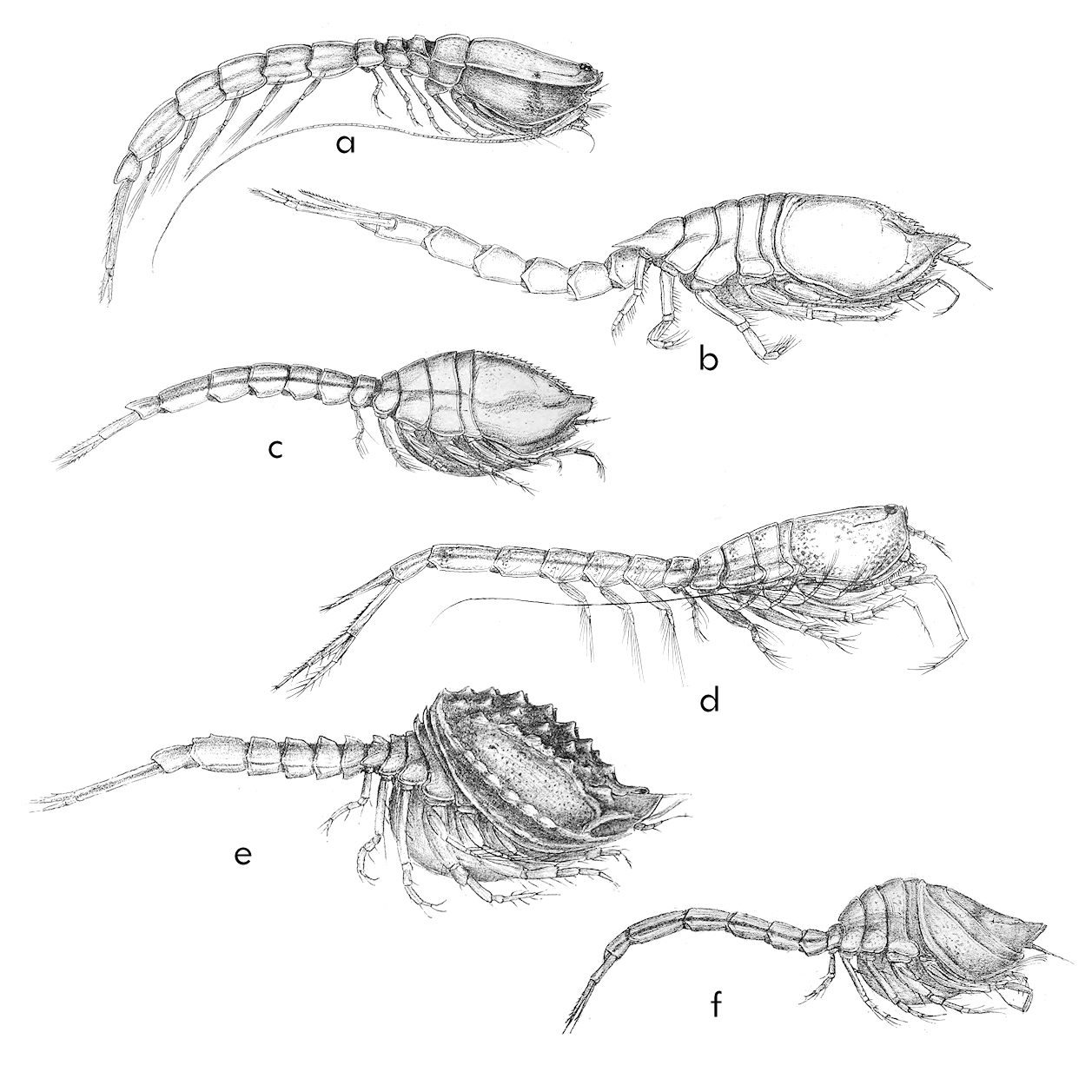
Diversity of forms as shown here in six of the extant families. (a) Bodotriidae, (b) Diastylidae, (c) Leuconidae, (d) Lampropidae, (e) Nannastacidae, (f) Pseudocumatidae

Cumaceans belong to the superorder Peracarida, within the class Malacostraca. The order Cumacea is subdivided into 8 families, 141 genera, and 1,523 species:

- Bodotriidae Scott, 1901 (379 species in 36 genera)
- Ceratocumatidae Calman, 1905 (10 species in 2 genera)
- Diastylidae Bate, 1856 (318 species in 22 genera)
- Gynodiastylidae Stebbing, 1912 (106 species in 12 genera)
- Lampropidae Sars, 1878 (114 species in 15 genera)
- Leuconidae Sars, 1878 (139 species in 16 genera)
- Nannastacidae Bate, 1866 (426 species in 25 genera)
- Pseudocumatidae Sars, 1878 (30 species in 12 genera)

One species is also placed incertae sedis in the order.

== See also ==
- List of Cumacea literature
