= Quantum regression theorem =

Quantum regression theorem (QRT) is a result in quantum statistical mechanics and quantum optics that provides a rule for computing multi-time correlation functions from the same reduced dynamics that describes one-time expectation values of an open quantum system.

== Statement ==
A common formulation (used in open-systems and quantum-optics texts) is the following. Suppose there exists a set of system operators $\{B_i\}$ such that the (Markovian) master equation implies a closed linear system of first-order differential equations for their expectation values,
$$\frac{d}{dt}\langle B_i(t)\rangle=\sum_j G_{ij}\,\langle B_j(t)\rangle,$$
with a (time-independent) coefficient matrix $G_{ij}$. Then the quantum regression theorem states that the corresponding two-time correlation functions satisfy the same system of equations (as a function of the time difference $\tau\ge 0$),
$$\frac{d}{d\tau}\langle B_i(t+\tau)\,B_\ell(t)\rangle
=
\sum_j G_{ij}\,\langle B_j(t+\tau)\,B_\ell(t)\rangle,$$
for each fixed index $\ell$ (and similarly for other operator orderings, with the appropriate convention).

Equivalently, writing the reduced dynamics as a dynamical map $\Phi_\tau$ (for example $\Phi_\tau=e^{\mathcal{L}\tau}$ for a time-homogeneous generator $\mathcal{L}$), one may express two-time correlations in terms of an auxiliary operator evolved by the same map:
$$\langle A(t+\tau)\,B(t)\rangle
=
\mathrm{Tr}\!\left[A\,\Phi_\tau\!\bigl(B\,\rho(t)\bigr)\right],
\qquad \tau\ge 0,$$
(with the product $B\,\rho(t)$ replaced by $\rho(t)\,B$ if the chosen convention requires it). Higher-order multi-time correlations follow by repeated application of $\Phi$ between successive operator insertions.

== Use and limitations ==
The QRT is widely used to compute spectra and noise properties (for example, fluorescence and resonance fluorescence spectra) in Markovian open-system models. Its validity is commonly tied to the approximations used to derive a Markovian master equation (such as negligible memory effects and suitable initial system–environment factorization). When these assumptions fail, especially for strongly non-Markovian dynamics, the QRT can become inaccurate and may require modifications.
