= Valentin Franke =

Soviet–Russian theoretical physicist (1926–2025)

- Валентин Франке
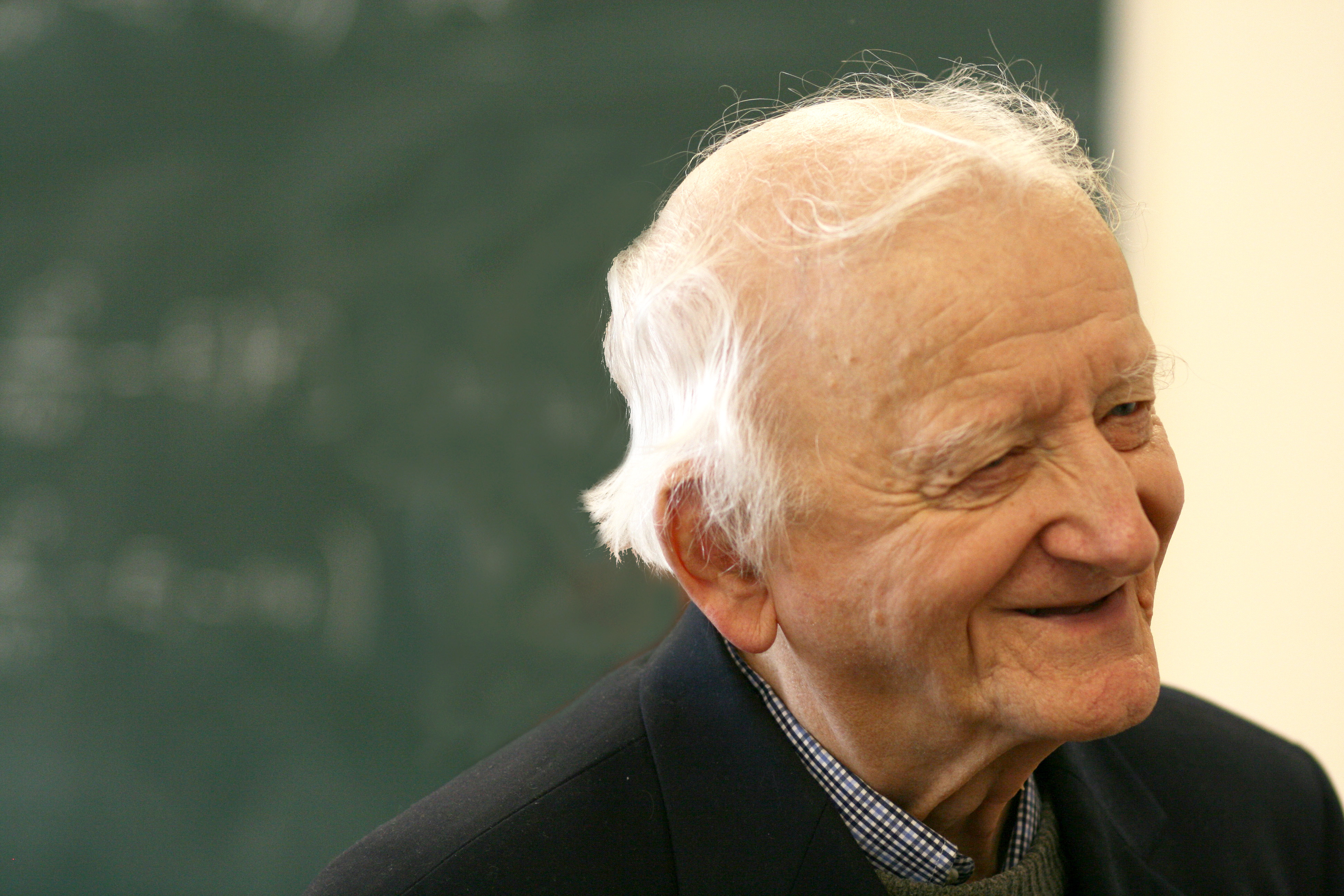
- Franke in 2010
- Born: 16 February 1926
- Died: 31 January 2025 (aged 98)
- Education: Leningrad State University
- Known for: One of the authors of the FGKLS equation (Lindblad equation)
- Scientific career
- Fields: Theoretical physics
- Workplaces: Saint Petersburg State University
- Doctoral advisor: Yury Novozhilov

Valentin Alfredovich Franke (Russian: Валенти́н Альфре́дович Фрáнке; 16 February 1926 – 31 January 2025) was a Soviet and Russian theoretical physicist and academic. A Doctor of Sciences, he was professor of the High Energy & Elementary Particle at the Physics Department of Saint Petersburg State University.

== Background and early career ==
V. A. Franke graduated from Kyiv Polytechnic Institute in 1949. After that he was distributed to a power plant in Amur Oblast, Russian Far East. In 1954 he externally graduated from Leningrad State University and then worked in Institute of Labor Protection in Leningrad.

In 1962 V. A. Franke joined the physical faculty of LSU. He obtained his PhD under the supervision of Yury Novozhilov in 1965 and was habilitated in 1984. He was a professor of High Energy & Elementary Particle Physics Department until his retirement in 2020.

== Scientific and educational activity ==
Franke worked in the fields of elementary particle physics, quantum mechanics and theory of gravitation. He wrote more than 70 papers on these topics.

In 1976, Franke obtained the general form of the renowned master equation for the evolution of density matrix. This equation was derived independently and simultaneously by V. A. Franke, G. Lindblad and V. Gorini, A. Kossakowski and E. C. G. Sudarshan (see). FGKLS (Franke–Gorini–Kossakowski–Lindblad–Sudarshan) equation plays an important role in the description of open quantum systems and the quantum measurement theory. V. A. Franke himself considered this equation as a natural generalisation of standard quantum mechanics, whose validity has to be proven experimentally.

From 1981, Franke and his colleagues have been working on the light front quantization of the Yang—Mills theory. This approach proves itself useful in non-perturbative description of quantum chromodynamics.

After the death of his long-time friend and colleague, Yuri Yappa, V. A. Franke had completed and edited his unfinished monograph on the spinor theory.

== Death ==
Franke died on 31 January 2025, at the age of 98.
