= Zwanzig projection operator =

Mathematical device used in statistical mechanics

The Zwanzig projection operator is a mathematical device used in statistical mechanics. This projection operator acts in the linear space of phase space functions and projects onto the linear subspace of "slow" phase space functions. It was introduced by Robert Zwanzig to derive a generic master equation. It is mostly used in this or similar context in a formal way to derive equations of motion for some "slow" collective variables.

== Slow variables and scalar product ==
The Zwanzig projection operator operates on functions in the $6N$-dimensional phase space $\Gamma=\{\mathbf{q}_i, \mathbf{p}_i\}$ of $N$ point particles with coordinates $\mathbf{q}_i$ and momenta $\mathbf{p}_i$. A special subset of these functions is an enumerable set of "slow variables" $A(\Gamma)=\{A_n(\Gamma)\}$. Candidates for some of these variables might be the long-wavelength Fourier components $\rho_k(\Gamma)$ of the mass density and the long-wavelength Fourier components $\mathbf{\pi}_\mathbf{k}(\Gamma)$ of the momentum density with the wave vector $\mathbf{k}$ identified with $n$. The Zwanzig projection operator relies on these functions but does not tell how to find the slow variables of a given Hamiltonian $H(\Gamma)$.

A scalar product between two arbitrary phase space functions $f_1(\Gamma)$ and $f_2(\Gamma)$ is defined by the equilibrium correlation

$$\left( f_{1},f_{2}\right) =\int d\Gamma\rho _{0}\left( \Gamma\right) f_{1}\left(\Gamma\right) f_{2}\left( \Gamma\right),$$

where

$$\rho _{0}\left( \Gamma\right) =\frac{\delta \left( H\left( \Gamma\right) -E\right) }{\int d\Gamma^{\prime }\delta \left( H\left( \Gamma^{\prime }\right) -E\right) },$$

denotes the microcanonical equilibrium distribution. "fast" variables, by definition, are orthogonal to all functions $G(A(\Gamma))$ of $A(\Gamma)$ under this scalar product. This definition states that fluctuations of fast and slow variables are uncorrelated, and according to the ergodic hypothesis this also is true for time averages. If a generic function $f(\Gamma)$ is correlated with some slow variables, then one may subtract functions of slow variables until there remains the uncorrelated fast part of $f(\Gamma)$. The product of a slow and a fast variable is a fast variable.

== The projection operator ==
Consider the continuous set of functions
$$\Phi_a(\Gamma) = \delta(A(\Gamma)-a) = \prod_{n}\delta(A_n(\Gamma)-a_n)$$
with $a =a_n$ constant. Any phase space function $G(A(\Gamma))$ depending on $\Gamma$ only through $A(\Gamma)$ is a function of the $\Phi_a$, namely

$$G(A\left( \Gamma\right) )=\int daG\left( a\right) \delta \left( A\left( \Gamma\right)-a\right).$$

A generic phase space function $f(\Gamma)$ decomposes according to

$$f\left( \Gamma\right) =F\left( A\left( \Gamma\right) \right) +R\left( \Gamma\right),$$

where $R(\Gamma)$ is the fast part of $f(\Gamma)$. To get an expression for the slow part $F(\Gamma)$ of $f$ take the scalar product with the slow function $\delta(A(\Gamma)-a)$,

$$\int d\Gamma\rho _{0}\left( \Gamma\right) f\left( \Gamma\right) \delta \left( A\left(\Gamma\right) -a\right) =\int d\Gamma\rho _{0}\left( \Gamma\right) F\left( A\left(\Gamma\right) \right) \delta \left( A\left( \Gamma\right) -a\right) =F\left( a\right)\int d\Gamma\rho _{0}\left( \Gamma\right) \delta \left(A\left( \Gamma\right)-a\right).$$

This gives an expression for $F(\Gamma)$, and thus for the operator $P$ projecting an arbitrary function $f(\Gamma)$ to its "slow" part depending on $\Gamma$ only through $A(\Gamma)$,

$$P\cdot f\left( \Gamma\right) =F\left( A\left( \Gamma\right) \right) =\frac{\int d\Gamma^{\prime }\rho
_{0}\left( \Gamma^{\prime }\right) f\left( \Gamma^{\prime }\right) \delta \left(
A\left( \Gamma^{\prime }\right) -A\left( \Gamma\right) \right) }{\int d\Gamma^{\prime }\rho
_{0}\left( \Gamma^{\prime }\right) \delta \left( A\left( \Gamma^{\prime }\right)
-A\left( \Gamma\right) \right) }.$$

This expression agrees with the expression given by Zwanzig, except that Zwanzig subsumes $H(\Gamma)$ in the slow variables. The Zwanzig projection operator fulfills $PG(A(\Gamma))=G(A(\Gamma))$ and $P^2=P$. The fast part of $f(\Gamma)$ is $(1-P)f(\Gamma)$. Functions of slow variables and in particular products of slow variables are slow variables. The space of slow variables thus is an algebra. The algebra in general is not closed under the Poisson bracket, including the Poisson bracket with the Hamiltonian.

== Connection with Liouville and Master equation ==
The ultimate justification for the definition of $P$ as given above is that it allows to derive a master equation for the time dependent probability distribution $p(a,t)$ of the slow variables (or Langevin equations for the slow variables themselves).

To sketch the typical steps, let $\rho(\Gamma,t)=\rho_{0}(\Gamma)\sigma(\Gamma,t)$ denote the time-dependent probability distribution in phase space. The phase space density $\sigma(\Gamma,t)$ (as well as $\rho(\Gamma,t)$) is a solution of the Liouville equation

$$i\frac{\partial}{\partial t}\sigma (\Gamma,t)=L\sigma (\Gamma,t).$$

The crucial step then is to write $\rho_{1}=P\sigma$, $\rho_{2}=(1-P)\sigma$ and to project the Liouville equation onto the slow and the fast subspace,

$$i\frac{\partial}{\partial t}\rho_{1} =PL\rho_{1}+PL\rho_{2},$$
$$i\frac{\partial}{\partial t}\rho_{2} =\left(1-P\right) L\rho_{2}+\left(1-P\right)L\rho_{1}.$$

Solving the second equation for $\rho_{2}$ and inserting $\rho_{2}(\Gamma,t)$ into the first equation gives a closed equation for $\rho _{1}$ (see Nakajima–Zwanzig equation). The latter equation finally gives an equation for $p(A(\Gamma),t)=p_{0}(A(\Gamma))\rho_{1}(\Gamma,t),$ where $p_{0}(a)$ denotes the equilibrium distribution of the slow variables.

== Nonlinear Langevin equations ==
The starting point for the standard derivation of a Langevin equation is the identity $1 = P + Q$, where $Q$ projects onto the fast subspace. Consider discrete small time steps $\tau$ with evolution operator $U\cong 1 +i\tau L$, where $L$ is the Liouville operator. The goal is to express $U^n$ in terms of $U^kP$ and $Q(UQ)^m$. The motivation is that $U^kP$ is a functional of slow variables and that $Q(UQ)^m$ generates expressions which are fast variables at every time step. The expectation is that fast variables isolated in this way can be represented by some model data, for instance by a Gaussian white noise. The decomposition is achieved by multiplying $1 = P + Q$ from the left with $U$, except for the last term, which is multiplied with $U = PU + QU$. Iteration gives

$$\begin{align}
1 &=  P+Q,\\
U &=  UP+PUQ+QUQ,\\
... &=  ...\\
U^{n} &=  U^{n}P+\sum_{m=1}^{n}U^{n-m}P\left(UQ\right)^{m}+Q\left(UQ\right)^{n}.
\end{align}$$

The last line can also be proved by induction. Assuming $U=1 +itL/n$ and performing the limit $n\rightarrow\infty$ directly leads to the operator identity of Kawasaki

$$e^{itL}=e^{itL}P+i\int_{0}^{t}dse^{i\left(t-s\right)L}PLQe^{isLQ}+Qe^{itLQ}.$$

A generic Langevin equation is obtained by applying this equation to the time derivative of a slow variable $A$, $dA(\Gamma,t)/dt= e^{itL}(dA(\Gamma,t)/dt)_{t=0}$,

$$\begin{align}
\frac{dA}{dt}\left(\Gamma,t\right) &= V+K+R,\\
V &=  e^{itL}P\dot{A}\left(\Gamma,0\right),\\
K &= i\int_{0}^{t}dse^{i\left(t-s\right)L}PLQe^{isLQ}\dot{A}\left(\Gamma,0\right)=i\int_{0}^{t}dse^{i\left(t-s\right)L}PLR\left(s\right),\\
R &=  Qe^{itLQ}\dot{A}\left(\Gamma,0\right).
\end{align}$$

Here $R$ is the fluctuating force (it only depends on fast variables). Mode coupling term $V$ and damping term $K$ are functionals of $A(t)$ and $A(t-s)$ and can be simplified considerably.

== Discrete set of functions, relation to the Mori projection operator ==
Instead of expanding the slow part of $f(\Gamma)$ in the continuous set $\Phi_a(\Gamma)=\delta(A(\Gamma)-a)$ of functions one also might use some enumerable set of functions $\Phi_n(A(\Gamma))$. If these functions constitute a complete orthonormal function set then the projection operator simply reads

$$P\cdot f\left( \Gamma\right) =\sum_{n}\left( f,\Phi _{n}\right) \Phi _{n}\left(A\left( \Gamma\right) \right).$$

A special choice for $\Phi_n(A(\Gamma))$ are orthonormalized linear combinations of the slow variables $A(\Gamma)$. This leads to the Mori projection operator. However, the set of linear functions is not complete, and the orthogonal variables are not fast or random if nonlinearity in $A$ comes into play.

== See also ==
- Mori-Zwanzig formalism
