= Quantum Markov semigroup =

Mathematical structure that describes the dynamics in a Markovian open quantum system

In quantum mechanics, a quantum Markov semigroup describes the dynamics in a Markovian open quantum system. The axiomatic definition of the prototype of quantum Markov semigroups was first introduced by A. M. Kossakowski in 1972, and then developed by V. Gorini, A. M. Kossakowski, E. C. G. Sudarshan and Göran Lindblad in 1976.

== Motivation ==
In practice, a quantum system will not exist in isolation, but instead will be surrounded by and interact with an environment, which typically has a large number of degrees of freedom (for example an atom interacting with the surrounding radiation field). A complete microscopic description of the degrees of freedom of the environment is typically too complicated. Hence, one looks for simpler descriptions of the dynamics of the open system. In principle, one should investigate the unitary dynamics of the total system, i.e. the system and the environment, to obtain information about the reduced system of interest by averaging the appropriate observables over the degrees of freedom of the environment. To model the dissipative effects due to the interaction with the environment, the Schrödinger equation is replaced by a suitable master equation, such as a Lindblad equation or a stochastic Schrödinger equation in which the infinite degrees of freedom of the environment are "synthesized" as a few quantum noises. Mathematically, time evolution in a Markovian open quantum system is no longer described by means of one-parameter groups of unitary maps, but one needs to introduce quantum Markov semigroups.

== Definitions ==
=== Quantum dynamical semigroup (QDS) ===
In general, quantum dynamical semigroups can be defined on von Neumann algebras, so the dimensionality of the system could be infinite. Let $\mathcal{A}$ be a von Neumann algebra acting on Hilbert space $\mathcal{H}$, a quantum dynamical semigroup on $\mathcal{A}$ is a collection of bounded operators on $\mathcal{A}$, denoted by $\mathcal{T} := \left( \mathcal{T}_t \right)_{t \ge 0}$, with the following properties:

1. $\mathcal{T}_0 \left( a \right) = a$, $\forall a \in \mathcal{A}$,
2. $\mathcal{T}_{t + s} \left( a \right) = \mathcal{T}_t \left( \mathcal{T}_s \left( a \right) \right)$, $\forall s, t \ge 0$, $\forall a \in \mathcal{A}$,
3. $\mathcal{T}_t$ is completely positive for all $t \ge 0$,
4. $\mathcal{T}_t$ is a $\sigma$-weakly continuous operator in $\mathcal{A}$ for all $t \ge 0$,
5. For all $a \in \mathcal{A}$, the map $t \mapsto \mathcal{T}_t \left( a \right)$ is continuous with respect to the $\sigma$-weak topology on $\mathcal{A}$.

Under the condition of complete positivity, the operators $\mathcal{T}_t$ are $\sigma$-weakly continuous if and only if $\mathcal{T}_t$ are normal. Recall that, letting $\mathcal{A}_+$ denote the convex cone of positive elements in $\mathcal{A}$, a positive operator $T : \mathcal{A} \rightarrow \mathcal{A}$ is said to be normal if for every increasing net $\left( x_\alpha \right)_\alpha$ in $\mathcal{A}_+$ with least upper bound $x$ in $\mathcal{A}_+$ one has
$$\lim_{\alpha} \langle u, (T x_\alpha) u \rangle = \sup_{\alpha} \langle u, (T x_\alpha) u \rangle = \langle u, (T x) u \rangle$$
for each $u$ in a norm-dense linear sub-manifold of $\mathcal{H}$.

=== Quantum Markov semigroup (QMS) ===
A quantum dynamical semigroup $\mathcal{T}$ is said to be identity-preserving (or conservative, or Markovian) if

$\mathcal{T}_t \left( \boldsymbol{1} \right) = \boldsymbol{1}, \quad \forall t \ge 0,$	1

where $\boldsymbol{1} \in \mathcal{A}$ is the identity element. For simplicity, $\mathcal{T}$ is called quantum Markov semigroup. Notice that, the identity-preserving property and positivity of $\mathcal{T}_t$ imply $\left\| \mathcal{T}_t \right\| = 1$ for all $t \ge 0$ and then $\mathcal{T}$ is a contraction semigroup.

The Condition (1) plays an important role not only in the proof of uniqueness and unitarity of solution of a Hudson–Parthasarathy quantum stochastic differential equation, but also in deducing regularity conditions for paths of classical Markov processes in view of operator theory.

=== Infinitesimal generator of QDS ===
The infinitesimal generator of a quantum dynamical semigroup $\mathcal{T}$ is the operator $\mathcal{L}$ with domain $\operatorname{Dom} (\mathcal{L})$, where
$$\operatorname{Dom} \left( \mathcal{L} \right) := \left\{ a \in \mathcal{A} ~\left\vert~ \lim_{t \rightarrow 0} \frac{\mathcal{T}_t(a) - a}{t} = b \text{ in } \sigma\text{-weak topology} \right. \right\}$$
and $\mathcal{L}(a) := b$.

== Characterization of generators of uniformly continuous QMSs ==
If the quantum Markov semigroup $\mathcal{T}$ is uniformly continuous in addition, which means $\lim_{t \rightarrow 0^+} \left\| \mathcal{T}_t - \mathcal{T}_0 \right\| = 0$, then

- the infinitesimal generator $\mathcal{L}$ will be a bounded operator on von Neumann algebra $\mathcal{A}$ with domain $\mathrm{Dom} (\mathcal{L}) = \mathcal{A}$,
- the map $t \mapsto \mathcal{T}_t a$ will automatically be continuous for every $a \in \mathcal{A}$,
- the infinitesimal generator $\mathcal{L}$ will be also $\sigma$-weakly continuous.

Under such assumption, the infinitesimal generator $\mathcal{L}$ has the characterization
$$\mathcal{L} \left( a \right) = i \left[ H, a \right] + \sum_{j} \left( V_j^\dagger a V_j - \frac{1}{2} \left\{ V_j^\dagger V_j, a \right\} \right)$$
where $a \in \mathcal{A}$, $V_j \in \mathcal{B} (\mathcal{H})$, $\sum_{j} V_j^\dagger V_j \in \mathcal{B} (\mathcal{H})$, and $H \in \mathcal{B} (\mathcal{H})$ is self-adjoint. Moreover, above $\left[ \cdot, \cdot \right]$ denotes the commutator, and $\left\{ \cdot, \cdot \right\}$ the anti-commutator.

== See also ==
- Operator topologies – Topologies on operators on a Hilbert space
- Von Neumann algebra – *-algebra of bounded operators on a Hilbert space
- C0 semigroup – Generalization of the exponential function
- Contraction semigroup – Generalization of the exponential function
- Lindbladian – Markovian quantum master equation for density matrices (mixed states)
- Markov chain – Random process independent of past history
- Quantum mechanics – Description of physical properties at the atomic and subatomic scale
- Open quantum system – Quantum mechanical system that interacts with a quantum-mechanical environment
