= Quantum master equation =

Concept in quantum mechanics

The evolution of the z-component of the Bloch vector of a two-level atom undergoing damped Rabi oscillations as predicted by its master equation (bottom), compared to two measurement choices (photon-counting measurements and homodyne detection).

In quantum information, a quantum master equation is a general equation describing the evolution of a quantum system interacting with its environment. They are a generalization of master equations, equations that describe the evolution of probabilistic combination of states. Quantum master equations are differential equations for a system's density matrix, a matrix descriptions of the quantum system.

Rather than just a system of differential equations for a set of probabilities (which only constitutes the diagonal elements of a density matrix), quantum master equations are differential equations for the entire density matrix, including off-diagonal elements. A density matrix with only diagonal elements can be modeled as a classical random process, therefore such an "ordinary" master equation is considered classical. Off-diagonal elements represent quantum coherence which is a physical characteristic that is intrinsically quantum mechanical.

Some quantum master equations, such as the Nakajima–Zwanzig equation, are formally exact, but are in general as difficult to solve as the full quantum problem. Instead, many master equations take the Markovian approximation to achieve reduced dynamics. This approximation assumes that the environment, or bath, is memoryless. Approximate Markovian quantum master equations include the Redfield equation and Lindblad equation. These equations are very easy to solve, but are not generally accurate for all systems.

Some modern approximations based on quantum master equations, which show better agreement with exact numerical calculations in some cases, include the polaron transformed quantum master equation and the VPQME (variational polaron transformed quantum master equation).

Numerically exact approaches to the kinds of problems to which master equations are usually applied include numerical Feynman integrals, quantum Monte Carlo, DMRG and NRG, MCTDH, and HEOM.

== Background and motivation ==
The time evolution of a closed quantum system is described by the Schrödinger equation,

$$i\dot{\psi} = H\psi
\qquad
\psi_t = U_t \psi_0 ,$$

For more than one parameter, such as in an entangled state or a classical ensemble of quantum states, the density matrix is instead used. For the density matrix, the time evolution is given by the von Neumann equation,

$$\dot{\rho} = -i[H,\rho]
\qquad
\rho_t = U_t \rho_0 U_t^{\dagger}$$

However, this still describes a closed system. Instead, the system is described by the evolution law

$$\rho' = \Lambda \rho
= \sum_{\alpha} K_{\alpha} \rho K_{\alpha}^{\dagger} , \quad\textrm{where}\quad \sum_{\alpha} K_{\alpha}K_{\alpha}^{\dagger} = I$$

This is not yet a quantum master equation since it is not a differential equation. In the Markovian approximation, this law gives:

$$\frac{d\rho}{dt} = \mathcal{L}\rho
\qquad
\rho_t = e^{t\mathcal{L}}\,\rho_0 ,$$

which is a master equation for $\rho$ in the Markovian approximation.

== See also ==
- Open quantum system
- Quantum dynamics
- Quantum coherence
- Differential equation
- Master equation
- Lindblad equation
- Nakajima–Zwanzig equation
- Feynman integral
