= Alfred Redfield =

Alfred Redfield may refer to:

- Alfred C. Redfield (1890–1983), American oceanographer
- Alfred G. Redfield (1929–2019), American physicist and biochemist
