= Reduced dynamics =

In quantum mechanics, especially in the study of open quantum systems, reduced dynamics refers to the time evolution of a density matrix for a system coupled to an environment. Consider a system and environment initially in the state $\rho_{SE} (0) \,$ (which in general may be entangled) and undergoing unitary evolution given by $U_t \,$. Then the reduced dynamics of the system alone is simply

$$\rho_S (t) = \mathrm{Tr}_E [U_t \rho_{SE} (0) U_t^\dagger]$$

If we assume that the mapping $\rho_S(0) \mapsto \rho_S(t)$ is linear and completely positive, then the reduced dynamics can be represented by a quantum operation. This mean we can express it in the operator-sum form

$$\rho_S = \sum_i F_i \rho_S (0) F_i^\dagger$$

where the $F_i \,$ are operators on the Hilbert space of the system alone, and no reference is made to the environment. In particular, if the system and environment are initially in a product state $\rho_{SE} (0) = \rho_S (0) \otimes \rho_E (0)$, it can be shown that the reduced dynamics are completely positive. However, the most general possible reduced dynamics are not completely positive.
