= Göran Lindblad =

Göran Lindblad may refer to:

- Göran Lindblad (politician) (born 1950), Swedish politician
- Göran Lindblad (physicist) (1940–2022), Swedish physicist
