= Quantum dynamics =

Study of quantum systems changing with time

In physics, quantum dynamics is the quantum version of classical dynamics. Quantum dynamics deals with the motions, and energy and momentum exchanges of systems whose behavior is governed by the laws of quantum mechanics. Quantum dynamics is relevant for burgeoning fields, such as quantum computing and atomic optics.

In mathematics, quantum dynamics is the study of the mathematics behind quantum mechanics. Specifically, as a study of dynamics, this field investigates how quantum mechanical observables change over time. Most fundamentally, this involves the study of one-parameter automorphisms of the algebra of all bounded operators on the Hilbert space of observables (which are self-adjoint operators). These dynamics were understood as early as the 1930s, after Wigner, Stone, Hahn and Hellinger worked in the field. Mathematicians in the field have also studied irreversible quantum mechanical systems on von Neumann algebras.

== Fundamental Models of Time Evolution ==
The dynamics of a quantum system are governed by a specific equation of motion that depends on whether the system is considered closed (isolated from its environment) or open (coupled to an environment).

=== Closed Quantum Systems ===
A closed quantum system is one that is perfectly isolated from any external influence. The time evolution of such a system is described as unitary, which means that the total probability is conserved and the process is, in principle, reversible. The dynamics of closed systems are described by two equivalent, fundamental equations.

The most common formulation of quantum dynamics is the time-dependent Schrödinger equation. It describes the evolution of the system's state vector, denoted as a ket $|\psi(t)\rangle$. The equation is given by:

$$i\hbar\frac{\partial}{\partial t}|\psi(t)\rangle = \hat{H}|\psi(t)\rangle$$

Here, $i$ is the imaginary unit, $\hbar$ is the reduced Planck constant, $|\psi(t)\rangle$ is the state of the system at time $t$, and $\hat{H}$ is the Hamiltonian operator—the observable corresponding to the total energy of the system.

The Schrödinger equation is powerful but applies only to pure states. A more general description of a quantum system is the density matrix (or density operator), denoted $\rho$, which can represent both pure states and mixed states (statistical ensembles of quantum states). The time evolution of the density matrix is governed by the Liouville-von Neumann equation:

$$i\hbar\frac{d}{dt}\rho(t) = [\hat{H}, \rho(t)]$$

where $[\hat{H}, \rho(t)] = \hat{H}\rho(t) - \rho(t)\hat{H}$ is the commutator of the Hamiltonian with the density matrix. This equation is the quantum mechanical analogue of the classical Liouville's theorem. For a closed system, the Von Neumann equation is entirely equivalent to the Schrödinger equation, but its framework is essential for understanding the dynamics of open systems.

=== Open Quantum Systems ===
In practice, no quantum system is perfectly isolated from its environment. A system that interacts with its surroundings (often called a "bath") is known as an open quantum system. This interaction leads to a non-unitary evolution, where information and energy can be exchanged with the environment.

This exchange causes uniquely quantum phenomena to decay, a process known as decoherence, where the clean superposition of states degrades into a classical mixture. It also leads to dissipation, where the system loses energy to its environment.

The dynamics of open quantum systems are typically modeled using quantum master equations. The most general form for a system whose environment has no memory (a Markovian system) is the Lindblad equation, also known as the Gorini–Kossakowski–Sudarshan–Lindblad (GKSL) equation:

$$\frac{d}{dt}\rho(t) = - \frac{i}{\hbar}[\hat{H}, \rho] + \sum_k \left( L_k \rho L_k^\dagger - \frac{1}{2}\{L_k^\dagger L_k, \rho\} \right)$$

In this equation:

- The first term, $- \frac{i}{\hbar}[\hat{H}, \rho]$, describes the ordinary unitary evolution of the system, identical to the Von Neumann equation.
- The second term, often called the "dissipator" or "Lindbladian", describes the irreversible, non-unitary dynamics due to the environment.
- The operators $L_k$ are known as Lindblad operators or quantum jump operators. They model the specific ways the system is coupled to the bath (e.g., through photon emission or thermal noise). The $\{A, B\} = AB + BA$ is the anticommutator.

The study of open quantum systems is critical for understanding the quantum-to-classical transition and is essential for technologies like quantum computing, where decoherence is a primary engineering challenge.

== Relation to classical dynamics ==
While quantum dynamics is fundamentally different from classical dynamics, it is also a generalization of it. The principles of classical mechanics emerge from quantum mechanics as an approximation in the macroscopic limit, a concept known as the correspondence principle.

The primary departure from classical physics lies in the nature of physical variables. In classical dynamics, variables like position ($x$) and momentum ($p$) are simple numbers (c-number). In quantum dynamics, they are represented by operators (q-numbers) which, crucially, do not necessarily commute. For instance, the position operator $\hat{X}$ and the momentum operator $\hat{P}$ are related by the canonical commutation relation:

$$[\hat{X}, \hat{P}] = \hat{X}\hat{P} - \hat{P}\hat{X} = i\hbar$$

This non-commutativity is the source of the Heisenberg uncertainty principle and fundamentally alters the dynamics of a system, making it impossible to simultaneously know the precise position and momentum of a particle. The relationship between the quantum commutator and the classical Poisson bracket, $[\hat{A}, \hat{B}] \leftrightarrow i\hbar\{A, B\}$, was a key insight in the development of quantum mechanics, first noted by Paul Dirac.

Despite this difference, the role of the Hamiltonian remains central in both frameworks. Just as the classical Hamiltonian generates the time evolution of a system through Hamilton's equations, the quantum Hamiltonian operator $\hat{H}$ dictates the evolution of the quantum state through the Schrödinger equation. For systems with large quantum numbers (i.e., on a macroscopic scale), the quantum evolution described by the Schrödinger equation will average out to produce the trajectory predicted by Newton's laws.

== See also ==
- Quantum Field Theory
- Perturbation theory
- Semigroups
- Pseudodifferential operators
- Brownian motion
- Dilation theory
- Quantum probability
- Free probability
