= Mori–Zwanzig formalism =

Method of statistical physics

The Mori–Zwanzig formalism, named after the physicists Hajime Mori and Robert Zwanzig, is a method of statistical physics. It allows the splitting of the dynamics of a system into a relevant and an irrelevant part using projection operators, which helps to find closed equations of motion for the relevant part. It is used e.g. in fluid mechanics or condensed matter physics.

== Idea ==
Macroscopic systems with a large number of microscopic degrees of freedom are often well described by a small number of relevant variables, for example the magnetization in a system of spins. The Mori–Zwanzig formalism allows the finding of macroscopic equations that only depend on the relevant variables based on microscopic equations of motion of a system, which are usually determined by the Hamiltonian. The irrelevant part appears in the equations as noise. The formalism does not determine what the relevant variables are, these can typically be obtained from the properties of the system.

The observables describing the system form a Hilbert space. The projection operator then projects the dynamics onto the subspace spanned by the relevant variables. The irrelevant part of the dynamics then depends on the observables that are orthogonal to the relevant variables. A correlation function is used as a scalar product, which is why the formalism can also be used for analyzing the dynamics of correlation functions.

== Derivation ==
A not explicitly time-dependent observable (Note: An analogous derivation can be found in, e.g., Robert Zwanzig Nonequilibrium Statistical Mechanics 3rd ed., Oxford University Press, New York, 2001, S.149 ff.) $A$ obeys the Heisenberg equation of motion

$$\frac{d}{dt} A = i L A,$$

where the Liouville operator $L$ is defined using the commutator $L = \frac{1}{\hbar}[H, \cdot]$ in the quantum case and using the Poisson bracket $L = -i \{H, \cdot\}$ in the classical case. We assume here that the Hamiltonian does not have explicit time-dependence. The derivation can also be generalized towards time-dependent Hamiltonians. This equation is formally solved by

$$A(t) = e^{iLt}A.$$

The projection operator acting on an observable $X$ is defined as

$$P X = (A,A)^{-1}(X,A)A,$$

where $A$ is the relevant variable (which can also be a vector of various observables), and $(\;,\;)$ is some scalar product of operators. The Mori product, a generalization of the usual correlation function, is typically used for this scalar product. For observables $X, Y$, it is defined as

$$(X,Y) = \frac{1}{\beta} \int_{0}^{\beta} d\alpha \text{Tr}(\bar{\rho} X e^{-\alpha H} Y e^{\alpha H}),$$

where $\beta = (k_B T)^{-1}$ is the inverse temperature, Tr is the trace (corresponding to an integral over phase space in the classical case) and $H$ is the Hamiltonian. $\bar{\rho}$ is the relevant probability operator (or density operator for quantum systems). It is chosen in such a way that it can be written as a function of the relevant variables only, but is a good approximation for the actual density, in particular such that it gives the correct mean values.

Now, we apply the operator identity

$$e^{iLt} = e^{i(1-P)Lt} + \int_{0}^{t} ds e^{iL(t-s)}PiLe^{i(1-P)Ls}$$

to

$$(1-P) iLA.$$

Using the projection operator introduced above and the definitions

$$\Omega = (iLA, A)(A,A)^{-1}$$

(frequency matrix),

$$F(t)= e^{t(1-P)L}(1-P)iLA$$

(random force) and

$$K(t)=(iLF(t),A)(A,A)^{-1}$$

(memory function), the result can be written as

$$\dot{A}(t) = \Omega A(t) + \int_{0}^{t} ds K(s) A(t-s) + F(t).$$

This is an equation of motion for the observable $A(t)$, which depends on its value at the current time $t$, the value at previous times (memory term) and the random force (noise, depends on the part of the dynamics that is orthogonal to $A(t)$).

== Markovian approximation ==
The equation derived above is typically difficult to solve due to the convolution term. Since we are typically interested in slow macroscopic variables changing timescales much larger than the microscopic noise, this has the effect of integrating over an infinite time limit while disregarding the lag in the convolution. We see this by expanding the equation to second order in $iLA(t)$, to obtain

$$\dot{A}(t) \approx \Omega A(t) + \int_{0}^{\infty} ds K(s) A(t) + F(t)$$,

where

$$K(t)= - (e^{iLt}(1-P)iLA,(1-P)iLA)(A,A)^{-1}$$.

== Generalizations ==
For larger deviations from thermodynamic equilibrium, the more general form of the Mori–Zwanzig formalism is used, from which the previous results can be obtained through a linearization. In this case, the Hamiltonian has explicit time-dependence. (Note: For a detailed derivation of the generalized equations of motion see Hermann Grabert Nonlinear Transport and Dynamics of Fluctuations Journal of Statistical Physics, Vol. 19, No. 5, 1978 and Hermann Grabert Projection operator techniques in nonequilibrium statistical mechanics, Springer Tracts in Modern Physics, Band 95, 1982) In this case, the transport equation for a variable

$$A(t) = a(t) - \delta A(t)$$,

where $a(t)$ is the mean value and $\delta A(t)$ is the fluctuation, be written as (use index notation with summation over repeated indices)

$$\dot{A}_i(t) = v_i(t) + \Omega_{ij}(t) \delta A_j(t) + \int_{0}^{t}ds K_i(t,s) + \phi_{ij} (t,s) \delta A_j(t) + F_i(t,0)$$,

where

$$v_i(t) = \text{Tr}(\bar{\rho}(t)A_i)$$,
$$\Omega_{ij}(t) = \text{Tr}(\frac{\partial \bar{\rho}(t)}{\partial a_j(t)} \dot{A}_i)$$,
$$K_i(t,s) = \text{Tr}(\bar{\rho}(s)iL(1-P(s))G(s,t)\dot{A}_i),$$

and

$$\phi_{ij}(t,s) = \text{Tr}(\frac{\partial \bar{\rho}(t)}{\partial a_j(t)} iL(1-P(s))G(s,t)\dot{A}_i) - \dot{a}_k(t)\text{Tr}(\frac{\partial^2 \bar{\rho}(t)}{\partial a_k(t) \partial a_j(t)}G(s,t)\dot{A}_i)$$.

We have used the time-ordered exponential

$$G(s,t) = T_- \exp(\int_{s}^{t} du iL(1-P(u)))$$

and the time-dependent projection operator

$$P(t)X = \text{Tr}(\bar{\rho}(t)X) + (A_i - a_i(t))\text{Tr}(\frac{\partial \bar{\rho}(t)}{\partial a_i(t)}X).$$

These equations can also be re-written using a generalization of the Mori product. Further generalizations can be used to apply the formalism to time-dependent Hamiltonians, general relativity, and arbitrary dynamical systems

== See also ==
- Nakajima–Zwanzig equation
- Zwanzig projection operator

== Sources ==
- Hermann Grabert, Projection operator techniques in nonequilibrium statistical mechanics, Springer Tracts in Modern Physics, Band 95, 1982.
- Robert Zwanzig, Nonequilibrium Statistical Mechanics 3rd ed., Oxford University Press, New York, 2001.
