= Yoshitaka Tanimura =

Japanese mathematical physicist

- Born: June 26, 1960 (age 66)
- Known for: Hierarchical equations of motion
- Awards: Humboldt Research Award (2011)
- Scientific career
- Fields: Physics, Chemical Physics

Yoshitaka Tanimura (谷村 吉隆, Yoshitaka Tanimura) is a Japanese mathematical physicist, best known for his invention with Ryogo Kubo of the Hierarchical equations of motion. In 1993, while working at University of Rochester with Shaul Mukamel, he published a theoretical paper laying the foundation for (optical) two-dimensional femtosecond spectroscopies.

== See also ==
- Hierarchical equations of motion
