= Open quantum system =

Quantum mechanical system that interacts with a quantum-mechanical environment

In physics, an open quantum system is a quantum mechanical system that interacts with an external quantum system, known as the environment or the bath. In general, these interactions significantly change the dynamics of the system, such that the information contained in the system is lost to its environment. Because no real quantum system is truly closed, that is, completely isolated from its surroundings, every real quantum system is in some ways an open quantum system. Open quantum systems theory aims to develop a theoretical framework for treating these interactions to obtain an accurate understanding of quantum systems.

Because the exact dynamics of the system and the environment are often impossible to calculate, theories of open quantum systems are often based around effective depictions that rely on sets of common assumptions about the behavior of the bath. For example, a common approximation is that the bath is Markovian, or memoryless. Taking this assumption results in a set of quantum master equations that reduce the complicated dynamics of the system to solvable differential equations.

Techniques developed in the context of open quantum systems have proven powerful in fields such as quantum optics, quantum measurement theory, quantum statistical mechanics, quantum information science, quantum thermodynamics, quantum cosmology, quantum biology, and semi-classical approximations.

== Quantum system and environment ==
Open quantum systems are sometimes described by a composite system. The interior system of interest, or principal system, is surrounded by an environment and together they create a closed quantum system. The term "open quantum system" may also be used to refer to the interior system and it may be called the "reduced system" in connection with its reduced density matrix. When the environment has an infinite number of degrees of freedom and thus the modes of the environment form a continuum, it is called a reservoir; this generally results in irreversible dynamics for the interior system. A heat bath or simply bath is a reservoir in thermal equilibrium.

Labeling the Hilbert space of the interior system $H_S$ and the environment by $H_B$, the Hilbert space of the combined system is given by the tensor product
$$H = H_S \otimes H_B.$$
The density matrix for the combined system can be written in terms of the state vectors in the combined Hilbert space, $\psi_\alpha$ as:
$$\rho = \Sigma_\alpha w_\alpha |\psi_\alpha\rangle\langle\psi_\alpha|$$
The normalized positive weights $w_\alpha$ describe a particular configuration of the system or one of a large ensemble of identical systems. The expectation value of a observable A in subspace $H_S$ can be written as
$$\langle A \rangle = \mathrm{tr}_S\{ A \rho_S \}$$
where
$$\rho_S = \mathrm{tr}_B \rho$$
is the reduced density matrix for system S. This reduced density matrix is primary focus of study for open quantum systems. The symbol $\mathrm{tr}_B$ represents the partial trace over system B and similarly $\mathrm{tr}_S$ represents the partial trace over system S.

== Models ==
Recent work has shown that thermodynamic consistency imposes commutativity constraints on the dissipative part of quantum dynamical maps, leading to a general structure for master equations in open systems. The time evolution of quantum systems can be determined by solving the effective equations of motion, also known as master equations, that govern how the density matrix describing the system changes over time and the dynamics of the observables that are associated with the system. In general, however, the environment that we want to model as being a part of our system is very large and complicated, which makes finding exact solutions to the master equations difficult, if not impossible. As such, the theory of open quantum systems seeks an economical treatment of the dynamics of the system and its observables. Typical observables of interest include things like energy and the robustness of quantum coherence (i.e. a measure of a state's coherence). Loss of energy to the environment is termed quantum dissipation, while loss of coherence is termed quantum decoherence.

Due to the difficulty of determining the solutions to the master equations for a particular system and environment, a variety of techniques and approaches have been developed. A common objective is to derive a reduced description wherein the system's dynamics are considered explicitly and the bath's dynamics are described implicitly. The main assumption is that the entire system-environment combination is a large closed system. Therefore, its time evolution is governed by a unitary transformation generated by a global Hamiltonian. For the combined system bath scenario the global Hamiltonian can be decomposed into:

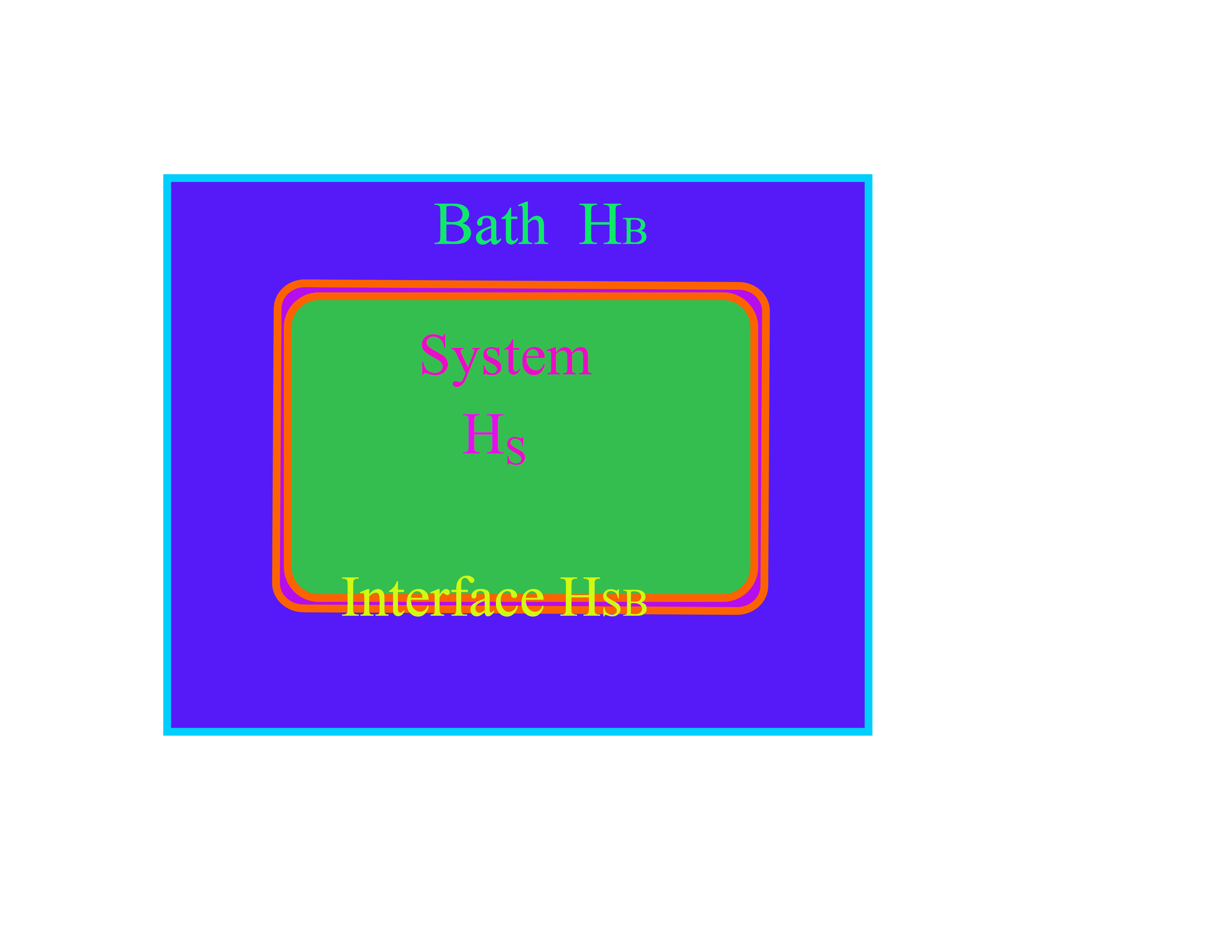
System–bath partition

$$H=H_{\rm S}+H_{\rm B}+H_{\rm SB}$$

where $H_{\rm S}$ is the system's Hamiltonian, $H_{\rm B}$ is the bath Hamiltonian and $H_{\rm SB}$ is the system-bath interaction. The state of the system can then be obtained from a partial trace over the combined system and bath: $\rho_{\rm S} (t) =\rm{tr}_{\rm B} \{\rho_{SB} (t)\}$.

It is also common to assume that the time evolution of the system is Markovian, meaning that the way the system's state changes depends only on its current state, with no "memory" of what the state was in the past. This approximation is justified when the system in question has enough time for the system to relax to equilibrium before being perturbed again by interactions with its environment. For systems that have very fast or very frequent perturbations from their coupling to their environment, this approximation becomes much less accurate. This is especially the case of systems where the bath is subjected to a time-dependent external driving force.

=== Markovian equations ===
When the interaction between the system and the environment is weak, a time-dependent perturbation theory seems appropriate for treating the evolution of the system. In other words, if the interaction between the system and its environment is weak, then any changes to the combined system over time can be approximated as originating from only the system in question. Another typical assumption is that the system and bath are initially uncorrelated $\rho(0)=\rho_{\rm S} \otimes \rho_{\rm B}$. This idea originated with Felix Bloch and was expanded upon by Alfred Redfield in his derivation of the Redfield equation. The Redfield equation is a Markovian master equation that describes the time evolution of the density matrix of the combined system. The drawback of the Redfield equation is that it does not conserve the positivity of the density operator.

A formal construction of a local equation of motion with a Markovian property is an alternative to a reduced derivation. The theory is based on an axiomatic approach. The basic starting point is a completely positive map. The assumption is that the initial system-environment state is uncorrelated $\rho(0)=\rho_{\rm S} \otimes \rho_{\rm B}$ and the combined dynamics is generated by a unitary operator. Such a map falls under the category of Kraus operator. The most general type of a time-homogeneous master equation with the Markovian property describing non-unitary evolution of the density matrix ρ that is trace-preserving and completely positive for any initial condition is the Gorini–Kossakowski–Sudarshan–Lindblad equation or GKSL equation:

$$\dot\rho_{\rm S}=-{i\over\hbar}[H_{\rm S},\rho_{\rm S}]+{\cal L}_{\rm D}(\rho_{\rm S})$$

$H_{\rm S}$ is a (Hermitian) Hamiltonian part and ${\cal L}_{\rm D}$:

$${\cal L}_{\rm D}(\rho_{\rm S})=\sum_n \left(V_n\rho_{\rm S} V_n^\dagger-\frac{1}{2}\left(\rho_{\rm S} V_n^\dagger V_n + V_n^\dagger V_n\rho_{\rm S}\right)\right)$$

is the dissipative part describing implicitly through system operators $V_n$ the influence of the bath on the system. The Markov property imposes that the system and bath are uncorrelated at all times $\rho_{\rm SB}=\rho_{\rm S} \otimes \rho_{\rm B}$. The GKSL equation is unidirectional and leads any initial state $\rho_{\rm S}$ to a steady state solution which is an invariant of the equation of motion $\dot \rho_{\rm S}(t \rightarrow \infty ) = 0$. The family of maps generated by the GKSL equation forms a quantum dynamical semigroup. In some fields, such as quantum optics, the term Lindblad superoperator is often used to express the quantum master equation for a dissipative system. E.B. Davis derived the GKSL with Markovian property master equations using perturbation theory and additional approximations, such as the rotating wave or secular, thus fixing the flaws of the Redfield equation. Davis construction is consistent with the Kubo–Martin–Schwinger stability criterion for thermal equilibrium i.e. the KMS state. An alternative approach to fix the Redfield has been proposed by J. Thingna, J.-S. Wang, and Peter Hänggi. that allows for system-bath interaction to play a role in equilibrium differing from the KMS state.

In 1981, Amir Caldeira and Anthony J. Leggett proposed a simplifying assumption in which the bath is decomposed to normal modes represented as harmonic oscillators linearly coupled to the system. As a result, the influence of the bath can be summarized by the bath spectral function. This method is known as the Caldeira–Leggett model, or harmonic bath model. To proceed and obtain explicit solutions, the path integral formulation description of quantum mechanics is typically employed. A large part of the power behind this method is the fact that harmonic oscillators are relatively well-understood compared to the true coupling that exists between the system and the bath. Unfortunately, while the Caldeira-Leggett model is one that leads to a physically consistent picture of quantum dissipation, its ergodic properties are too weak and so the dynamics of the model do not generate wide-scale quantum entanglement between the bath modes.

An alternative bath model is a spin bath. At low temperatures and weak system-bath coupling, the Caldeira–Leggett and spin bath models are equivalent. But for higher temperatures or strong system-bath coupling, the spin bath model has strong ergodic properties. Once the system is coupled, significant entanglement is generated between all modes. In other words, the spin bath model can simulate the Caldeira–Leggett model, but the opposite is not true.

An example of natural system being coupled to a spin bath is a nitrogen-vacancy (N-V) center in diamonds. In this example, the color center is the system and the bath consists of carbon-13 (^{13}C) impurities which interact with the system via the magnetic dipole-dipole interaction.

For open quantum systems where the bath has oscillations that are particularly fast, it is possible to average them out by looking at sufficiently large changes in time. This is possible because the average amplitude of fast oscillations over a large time scale is equal to the central value, which can always be chosen to be zero with a minor shift along the vertical axis. This method of simplifying problems is known as the secular approximation.

=== Non-Markovian equations ===
Open quantum systems that do not have the Markovian property are generally much more difficult to solve. This is largely due to the fact that the next state of a non-Markovian system is determined by each of its previous states, which rapidly increases the memory requirements to compute the evolution of the system. Currently, the methods of treating these systems employ what are known as projection operator techniques. These techniques employ a projection operator $\mathcal{P}$, which effectively applies the trace over the environment as described previously. The result of applying $\mathcal{P}$ to $\rho$ (i.e. calculating $\mathcal{P}\rho$) is called the relevant part of $\rho$. For completeness, another operator $\mathcal{Q}$ is defined so that $\mathcal{P}+\mathcal{Q}=\mathcal{I}$ where $\mathcal{I}$ is the identity matrix. The result of applying $\mathcal{Q}$ to $\rho$ (i.e. calculating $\mathcal{Q}\rho$) is called the irrelevant part of $\rho$. The primary goal of these methods is to then derive a master equation that defines the evolution of $\mathcal{P}\rho$.

One such derivation using the projection operator technique results in what is known as the Nakajima–Zwanzig equation. This derivation highlights the problem of the reduced dynamics being non-local in time:

$$\partial_t{\rho }_\mathrm{S}=\mathcal{P}{\cal L}{{\rho}_\mathrm{S}}+\int_{0}^{t}{dt'\mathcal{K}({t}'){{\rho }_\mathrm{S}}(t-{t}')}.$$

Here the effect of the bath throughout the time evolution of the system is hidden in the memory kernel $\kappa (\tau)$. While the Nakajima-Zwanzig equation is an exact equation that holds for almost all open quantum systems and environments, it can be very difficult to solve. This means that approximations generally need to be introduced to reduce the complexity of the problem into something more manageable. As an example, the assumption of a fast bath is required to lead to a time local equation: $\partial_t \rho_S = {\cal L } \rho_S$. Other examples of valid approximations include the weak-coupling approximation and the single-coupling approximation.

In some cases, the projection operator technique can be used to reduce the dependence of the system's next state on all of its previous states. This method of approaching open quantum systems is known as the time-convolutionless projection operator technique, and it is used to generate master equations that are inherently local in time. Because these equations can neglect more of the history of the system, they are often easier to solve than things like the Nakajima-Zwanzig equation.

Another approach emerges as an analogue of classical dissipation theory developed by Ryogo Kubo and Y. Tanimura. This approach is connected to hierarchical equations of motion which embed the density operator in a larger space of auxiliary operators such that a time local equation is obtained for the whole set and their memory is contained in the auxiliary operators.

=== Driven systems ===
In the presence of time-dependent external fields acting on the system but not on the bath, only the projected dynamics of the system is affected. It contains an additional external force term. The total Hamiltonian of the system is given by:

$$H_{T} = H_{\rm S} + H_{\rm B} + H_{\rm SB} + H_{ext,\rm S}$$

where $H_{ext,S}$ denotes the external field contribution acting on the system only, but not on the bath. If, instead, the time-dependent external field acts on both the system and the bath (environment) as well, the total Hamiltonian is:

$$H_{T} = H_{\rm S} + H_{\rm B} + H_{\rm SB} + H_{ext,\rm SB}$$

where $H_{ext,SB}$ denotes the external field contribution acting on both the system and the bath. Then the fluctuation-dissipation theorem has an extra term with respect to the case where the bath is undriven, which depends on the time-correlation of the external field. As a result, the dynamics is intrinsically non-Markovian even if the system and the bath are fully Markovian when the external field is switched off.

== History ==
In 1927, John von Neumann introduced the concept of density matrices to describe the statistical state of a quantum system, providing a mathematical framework for handling mixed states due to statistical ensembles and later to environmental interactions. This formalism became a cornerstone for studying open quantum systems, allowing for the description of mixed states arising from system-environment coupling.

In the 1940s, Felix Bloch developed an approach to understand nuclear spin systems in a magnetic field, as in nuclear magnetic resonance (NMR). His work laid the groundwork for studying relaxation and decoherence processes, introducing the first quantum master equation. This was later generalized to treat generic two-state quantum systems.

In the 1950s and 1960s, the quantum master equation was developed to describe the time evolution of open quantum systems. Alfred Redfield introduced the Redfield equation in 1957, a Markovian master equation for weakly coupled systems that used the Born-Markov approximation. However, it does not always guarantee density matrix positivity.

In 1970, H. Dieter Zeh formalized decoherence in his seminal paper. In the 1970s, the Lindblad equation, independently proposed by Göran Lindblad, Andrzej Kossakowski, and George Sudarshan (GKSL equation), provided a general Markovian framework ensuring complete positivity and trace preservation.

In 1981, Amir Caldeira and Anthony J. Leggett introduced the Caldeira–Leggett model, modeling the environment as harmonic oscillators linearly coupled to the system. This model is widely used for studying quantum dissipation and decoherence.

Theoretical methods for non-Markovian dynamics, accounting for environmental memory effects, were developed in the 1950s and 1960s through the Nakajima–Zwanzig formalism.

In the 1980s and 1990s, these same techniques gained broader application in advancing the understanding of quantum decoherence and entanglement in strongly coupled systems. They are now used in quantum information for studying dissipative phenomena in open quantum systems. With the development of quantum information in the 1990s and 2000s, new techniques have been tried such as Non-Markovian dynamics and numerical methods.

== See also ==
- Lindblad equation
- Markov property
- Master equation
- Quantum thermodynamics
