= Physical system =

Portion of the universe chosen for analysis

Weather map as an example of a physical system

A physical system is a collection of physical objects under study. The collection differs from a set; the objects must coexist and have some physical relationship. In other words, it is a portion of the physical universe chosen for analysis. Everything outside the system is known as the environment, which is ignored except for its effects on the system.

The split between system and environment is the analyst's choice, generally made to simplify the analysis. For example, the water in a lake, the water in half of a lake, or an individual molecule of water in the lake can each be considered a physical system. An isolated system is one that has negligible interaction with its environment. Often a system in this sense is chosen to correspond to the more usual meaning of system, such as a particular machine.

In the study of quantum coherence, the "system" may refer to the microscopic properties of an object (e.g. the mean of a pendulum bob), while the relevant "environment" may be the internal degrees of freedom, described classically by the pendulum's thermal vibrations. Because no measurable quantum system is isolated from its surroundings, it is important to develop a theoretical framework for treating these interactions in order to obtain an accurate understanding of quantum systems.

In control theory, a physical system being controlled (a "controlled system") is called a "plant".

== See also ==
- Conceptual systems
- Phase space
- Physical phenomenon
- Physical ontology
- Signal-flow graph
- Systems engineering
- Systems science
- Thermodynamic system
- Open quantum system
