= Nakajima–Zwanzig equation =

Integral equation in quantum simulations

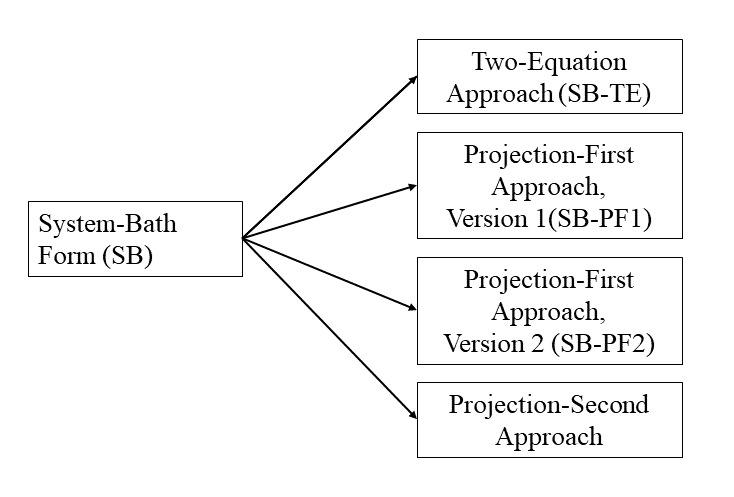
Four approaches to obtaining the memory kernel of the GQME considering the system-bath form of the Hamiltonian.

The Nakajima–Zwanzig equation (named after the physicists who developed it, Sadao Nakajima and Robert Zwanzig) is an integral equation describing the time evolution of the "relevant" part of a quantum-mechanical system. It is formulated in the density matrix formalism and can be regarded as a generalization of the master equation.

The equation belongs to the Mori–Zwanzig formalism within the statistical mechanics of irreversible processes (named after Hazime Mori). By means of a projection operator, the dynamics is split into a slow, collective part (relevant part) and a rapidly fluctuating irrelevant part. The goal is to develop dynamical equations for the collective part.

The Nakajima-Zwanzig (NZ) generalized master equation is a formally exact approach for simulating quantum dynamics in condensed phases. This framework is particularly designed to address the dynamics of a reduced system interacting with a larger environment, often represented as a system coupled to a bath. Within the NZ framework, one can choose between time convolution (TC) and time convolution less (TCL) forms of the quantum master equations.

The TC approach involves memory effects, where the future state of the system depends on its entire history (Non-Markovian dynamics). The TCL approach formulates the dynamics where the system's rate of change at any moment depends only on its current state, simplifying calculations by neglecting memory effects (Markovian dynamics).

== Derivation ==
The total Hamiltonian of a system interacting with its environment (or bath) is typically expressed in system-bath form,

$$\hat{H} = \hat{H}_S + \hat{H}_B + \hat{H}_{SB}$$

where $\hat{H}_S$ is the system Hamiltonian, $\hat{H}_B$ is the bath Hamiltonian, and $\hat{H}_{SB}$ describes the coupling between them.

The starting point (Note: A derivation analogous to that presented here is found, for instance, in Breuer, Petruccione The theory of open quantum systems, Oxford University Press 2002, S.443ff) is the quantum mechanical version of the Liouville equation, also known as the von Neumann equation:

$$\partial_t \rho = \frac{i}{\hbar}[\rho,H] = L \rho,$$

where the Liouville operator $L$ is defined as $L A = \frac{i}{\hbar}[A,H]$.

In the Nakajima-Zwanzig formulation, a key step involves defining a projection operator $\mathcal{P}$ that projects the total density operator $\rho$ onto the subspace of the system of interest. The complementary operator $\mathcal{Q}\equiv 1-\mathcal{P}$ projects onto the orthogonal subspace, effectively separating the system from the bath.

The Liouville – von Neumann equation can thus be represented as

$${\partial_t}\left( \begin{matrix}
\mathcal{P}  \\
\mathcal{Q}  \\
\end{matrix} \right)\rho =\left( \begin{matrix}
\mathcal{P}  \\
\mathcal{Q}  \\
\end{matrix} \right)L\left( \begin{matrix}
\mathcal{P}  \\
\mathcal{Q}  \\
\end{matrix} \right)\rho +\left( \begin{matrix}
\mathcal{P}  \\
\mathcal{Q}  \\
\end{matrix} \right)L\left( \begin{matrix}
\mathcal{Q}  \\
\mathcal{P}  \\
\end{matrix} \right)\rho.$$

The dynamics of the projected state $\mathcal{P}\rho$, under any idempotent projection operator (where$\mathcal{P}^2=\mathcal{P}$), is described by the NZ generalized master equation (GQME). This equation can be used to obtain a closed equation of motion for the reduced system dynamics, focusing solely on the dynamics within the subsystem of interest. $\frac{d}{dt}\mathcal{P}\hat{\rho}(t) = \mathcal{P} L\mathcal{P}\hat{\rho}(t)-i\int_{0}^{t} d\tau\mathcal{P}Le^{\mathcal{Q}L\tau}\mathcal{Q}L\mathcal{P}\hat{\rho}(t-\tau)+\mathcal{P}Le^{\mathcal{Q}L\tau}\mathcal{Q}\hat{\rho}(0)$

In practice, the specific form of the projection operator $\mathcal{P}$ can be chosen based on the problem at hand. One common choice involves defining $\mathcal{P}$ using a reference nuclear density operator $\hat{\rho}_{n}^{\text{ref}}$ such that $\text{Tr}_{B} \{ \hat{\rho}_{n}^{\text{ref}} \} = 1$.

$\mathcal{P}(\rho) = \hat{\rho}_n^{\text{ref}} \otimes \text{Tr}_n \{\rho\}$

This ensures that $\mathcal{P}$ remains idempotent. Using this projection, tracing over the nuclear Hilbert space leads to a generalized quantum master equation that describes the reduced electronic density operator which accounts for both Markovian dynamics generated by the Hamiltonian and non-Markovian dynamics due to coupling between electronic and nuclear degrees of freedom.

$\frac{d}{dt} \hat{\sigma}(t) = -\frac{i}{\hbar} (L)_n^{\text{ref}} \hat{\sigma}(t) - \int_0^t d\tau \,\mathcal{K}(\tau) \hat{\sigma}(t-\tau) + \hat{I}(t)$

This $\langle L \rangle_{n}^{\text{ref}} = \text{Tr}_{n} \{ L \hat{\rho}_{n}^{\text{ref}} \}$

describes the dynamics driven by the Hamiltonian, $\langle \hat{H} \rangle_n^{\text{ref}} = \text{Tr}_n \{ \hat{H} \rho_n^{\text{ref}} \}$which are Hamiltonian and Markovian in nature, while the other two terms on the right-hand side represent the non-Hamiltonian and non-Markovian dynamics that arise from the interactions between the electronic and nuclear degrees of freedom.

The memory kernel $\mathcal{K}(\tau)$ captures the effects of the bath on the system over the time interval from (0, t), reflecting non-Markovian dynamics where the system's history influences its future evolution.

$\mathcal{K}(\tau) = \frac{i}{\hbar^2} \operatorname{Tr}_n \{ L e^{-i\mathcal{Q}L\tau/\hbar}\mathcal{Q}L \hat{\rho}_n^{\text{ref}} \}$

The inhomogeneous term $\hat{I}(t)$ represents the influence of the initial state of the bath on the system at time t, which is crucial for accurately describing the system dynamics from an initial condition.

$\hat{I}(t) = \frac{i}{\hbar} \text{Tr}_n \left\{ L e^{-i\mathcal{Q}\tau/\hbar}\mathcal{Q} \hat{\rho}_n(0) \right\}$

The memory kernel is crucial for simulating the dynamics of the electronic degrees of freedom. However, calculating $\mathcal{K}(\tau)$ presents difficulties due to its time-dependent nature. Additionally, the time dependency of $\mathcal{K}(\tau)$ is complex because it is governed by the projection-dependent propagator, $e^{-i\mathcal{Q}L\tau/\hbar}$. Therefore, the exact memory kernel is difficult to calculate except for several analytically solvable models proposed by Shi-Geva to remove the projection operator $\mathcal{Q}$.

== See also ==
- Redfield equation
