= Master equation =

Equations governing time evolution of physical systems

In physics, chemistry, and related fields, master equations are used to describe the time evolution of a system that can be modeled as being in a probabilistic combination of states at any given time, and the switching between states is determined by a transition rate matrix. The equations are a set of differential equations – over time – of the probabilities that the system occupies each of the different states.

== Etymology ==
The name was proposed in 1940:

When the probabilities of the elementary processes are known, one can write down a continuity equation for W, from which all other equations can be derived and which we will call therefore the "master” equation.

— Nordsieck, Lamb, and Uhlenbeck, "On the theory of cosmic-ray showers I: The Furry model and the fluctuation problem" (1940)

== Formulation ==
A master equation is a phenomenological set of first-order differential equations describing the time evolution of (usually) the probability of a system to occupy each one of a discrete set of states with regard to a continuous time variable t. The most familiar form of a master equation is a matrix form:
$$\frac{d\vec{P}}{dt} = \mathbf{A}\vec{P},$$
where $\vec{P}$ is a column vector, and $\mathbf{A}$ is the matrix of connections. The way connections among states are made determines the dimension of the problem; it is either

- a d-dimensional system (where d is 1,2,3,...), where any state is connected with exactly its 2d nearest neighbors, or
- a network, where every pair of states may have a connection (depending on the network's properties).

When the connections are time-independent rate constants, the master equation represents a kinetic scheme, and the process is Markovian (any jumping time probability density function for state i is an exponential, with a rate equal to the value of the connection). When the connections depend on the actual time (i.e. matrix $\mathbf{A}$ depends on the time, $\mathbf{A}\rightarrow\mathbf{A}(t)$ ), the process is not stationary and the master equation reads
$$\frac{d\vec{P}}{dt} = \mathbf{A}(t)\vec{P}.$$

When the connections represent multi exponential jumping time probability density functions, the process is semi-Markovian, and the equation of motion is an integro-differential equation termed the generalized master equation:
$$\frac{d\vec{P}}{dt}= \int^t_0 \mathbf{A}(t- \tau )\vec{P}( \tau ) \, d \tau .$$

The transition rate matrix $\mathbf{A}$ can also represent birth and death, meaning that probability is injected (birth) or taken from (death) the system, and then the process is not in equilibrium.

When the transition rate matrix can be related to the probabilities, one obtains the Kolmogorov equations.

== Detailed description of the matrix and properties of the system ==
Let $\mathbf{A}$ be the matrix describing the transition rates (also known as kinetic rates or reaction rates). As always, the first subscript represents the row, the second subscript the column. That is, the source is given by the second subscript, and the destination by the first subscript. This is the opposite of what one might expect, but is appropriate for conventional matrix multiplication.

For each state k, the increase in occupation probability depends on the contribution from all other states to k, and is given by:
$$\sum_\ell A_{k\ell}P_\ell,$$
where $P_\ell$ is the probability for the system to be in the state $\ell$, while the matrix $\mathbf{A}$ is filled with a grid of transition-rate constants. Similarly, $P_k$ contributes to the occupation of all other states $P_\ell,$
$$\sum_\ell A_{\ell k}P_k,$$

In probability theory, this identifies the evolution as a continuous-time Markov process, with the integrated master equation obeying a Chapman–Kolmogorov equation.

The master equation can be simplified so that the terms with $\ell=k$ do not appear in the summation. This allows calculations even if the main diagonal of $\mathbf{A}$ is not defined or has been assigned an arbitrary value.
$$\frac{dP_k}{dt}
= \sum_\ell(A_{k\ell}P_\ell)
= \sum_{\ell\neq k}(A_{k\ell}P_\ell) + A_{kk}P_k
= \sum_{\ell\neq k}(A_{k\ell}P_\ell - A_{\ell k}P_k).$$

The final equality arises from the fact that
$$\sum_{\ell, k}(A_{\ell k}P_k) = \frac{d}{dt} \sum_\ell(P_{\ell}) = 0$$
because the summation over the probabilities $P_{\ell}$ yields one, a constant function. Since this has to hold for any probability $\vec{P}$ (and in particular for any probability of the form $P_{\ell} = \delta_{\ell k}$ for some k) we get
$$\sum_{\ell}(A_{\ell k}) =  0 \qquad \forall k.$$
Using this we can write the diagonal elements as
$$A_{kk} = -\sum_{\ell\neq k}(A_{\ell k}) \Rightarrow A_{kk} P_k = -\sum_{\ell\neq k}(A_{\ell k} P_k) .$$

The master equation exhibits detailed balance if each of the terms of the summation disappears separately at equilibrium—i.e. if, for all states k and ℓ having equilibrium probabilities $\pi_k$ and $\pi_\ell$,
$$A_{k \ell} \pi_\ell = A_{\ell k} \pi_k .$$

These symmetry relations were proved on the basis of the time reversibility of microscopic dynamics (microscopic reversibility) as Onsager reciprocal relations.

== Examples of master equations ==
Many physical problems in classical, quantum mechanics and problems in other sciences, can be reduced to the form of a master equation, thereby performing a great simplification of the problem (see mathematical model).

The Lindblad equation in quantum mechanics is a generalization of the master equation describing the time evolution of a density matrix. Though the Lindblad equation is often referred to as a master equation, it is not one in the usual sense, as it governs not only the time evolution of probabilities (diagonal elements of the density matrix), but also of variables containing information about quantum coherence between the states of the system (non-diagonal elements of the density matrix).

Another special case of the master equation is the Fokker–Planck equation which describes the time evolution of a continuous probability distribution. Complicated master equations which resist analytic treatment can be cast into this form (under various approximations), by using approximation techniques such as the system size expansion.

Stochastic chemical kinetics provide yet another example of the use of the master equation. A master equation may be used to model a set of chemical reactions when the number of molecules of one or more species is small (of the order of 100 or 1000 molecules). The chemical master equation can also solved for the very large models, such as the DNA damage signal from fungal pathogen Candida albicans.

== Quantum master equations ==
A quantum master equation is a generalization of the idea of a master equation. Rather than just a system of differential equations for a set of probabilities (which only constitutes the diagonal elements of a density matrix), quantum master equations are differential equations for the entire density matrix, including off-diagonal elements. A density matrix with only diagonal elements can be modeled as a classical random process, therefore such an "ordinary" master equation is considered classical. Off-diagonal elements represent quantum coherence which is a physical characteristic that is intrinsically quantum mechanical.

The Redfield equation and Lindblad equation are examples of approximate quantum master equations assumed to be Markovian. More accurate quantum master equations for certain applications include the polaron transformed quantum master equation, and the VPQME (variational polaron transformed quantum master equation).

== Theorem about eigenvalues of the matrix and time evolution ==
Because $\mathbf{A}$ fulfills
$$\sum_{\ell}A_{\ell k} =  0 \qquad \forall k$$
and
$$A_{\ell k} \geq 0 \qquad \forall \ell\neq k,$$
one can show using the Perron–Frobenius theorem that:

- There is at least one eigenvector with a vanishing eigenvalue, exactly one if the graph of $\mathbf{A}$ is strongly connected.
- All other eigenvalues $\lambda$ fulfill $0 > \operatorname{Re} \lambda \geq 2 \operatorname{min}_i A_{ii}$.
- All eigenvectors $v$ with a non-zero eigenvalue fulfill $\sum_{i}v_{i} = 0$.

This has important consequences for the time evolution of a state.

== See also ==
- Kolmogorov equations (Markov jump process)
- Continuous-time Markov process
- Quantum master equation
- Fermi's golden rule
- Detailed balance
- Boltzmann's H-theorem
