= Lindbladian =

Markovian quantum master equation for density matrices (mixed states)

In quantum mechanics, the Franke–Gorini–Kossakowski–Sudarshan–Lindblad (FGKSL) master equation (named after Valentin Franke, Vittorio Gorini, Andrzej Kossakowski, George Sudarshan and Göran Lindblad), Gorini–Kossakowski–Sudarshan–Lindblad (GKSL) master equation, master equation in Lindblad form, quantum Liouvillian, or Lindbladian is one of the general forms of Markovian master equations describing open quantum systems. It generalizes the Schrödinger equation to open quantum systems; that is, systems in contact with their surroundings. The resulting dynamics are no longer unitary, but still satisfy the property of being trace-preserving and completely positive for any initial condition.

The Schrödinger equation or, actually, the von Neumann equation, is a special case of the GKSL equation, which has led to some speculation that quantum mechanics may be productively extended and expanded through further application and analysis of the Lindblad equation. The Schrödinger equation deals with state vectors, which can only describe pure quantum states and are thus less general than density matrices, which can describe mixed states as well.

== Motivation ==
Understanding the interaction of a quantum system with its environment is necessary for understanding many commonly observed phenomena like the spontaneous emission of light from excited atoms, or the performance of many quantum technological devices, like the laser.

In the canonical formulation of quantum mechanics, a system's time evolution is governed by unitary dynamics. This implies that there is no decay and phase coherence is maintained throughout the process. It is a consequence of the fact that all participating degrees of freedom are considered. However, any real physical system will interact with its environment as it cannot be perfectly isolated. The interaction with external degrees of freedom results in the dissipation of energy into its surroundings, which causes decay and randomization of phase.

Certain mathematical techniques have been introduced to treat the interaction of a quantum system with its environment. One of these is the use of the density matrix, and its associated master equation. While this approach to solving quantum dynamics is in principle equivalent to the Schrödinger picture or Heisenberg picture, it facilitates us to account for the incoherent processes that represent environmental interactions. The density operator has the property that it can represent a classical mixture of quantum states, and is thus vital to accurately describe the dynamics of so-called open quantum systems.

== Definition ==
=== Diagonal form ===
The Lindblad master equation for system's density matrix ρ can be written as

| $\dot\rho=-{i\over\hbar}[H,\rho]+\sum_{i}^{} \gamma_i\left(L_i\rho L_i^\dagger -\frac{1}{2} \left\{L_i^\dagger L_i, \rho\right\} \right)$ | eq.2.1 |

where $\{a, b\} = ab + ba$ is the anticommutator.

$H$ is the system Hamiltonian, describing the unitary aspects of the dynamics.

$\{L_i\}_{i}$ are a set of jump operators, describing the dissipative part of the dynamics. The shape of the jump operators describes how the environment acts on the system, and must either be determined from microscopic models of the system-environment dynamics, or phenomenologically modelled.

$\gamma_i \geq 0$ are a set of non-negative real coefficients called damping rates. If all $\gamma_i = 0$ one recovers the von Neumann equation $\dot\rho=-(i/\hbar)[H,\rho]$ describing unitary dynamics, which is the quantum analog of the classical Liouville equation.

The entire equation can be written in superoperator form

| $$\dot\rho= \mathcal L (\rho)$$ | eq.2.2 |

which resembles the classical Liouville equation $\dot \rho = \{H, \rho\}$. For this reason, the superoperator $\mathcal L$ is called the Lindbladian superoperator or the Liouvillian superoperator.

=== General form ===
More generally, the GKSL equation has the form

| $\dot\rho=-{i\over\hbar}[H,\rho]+\sum_{n,m } h_{nm}\left(A_n\rho A_m^\dagger-\frac{1}{2}\left\{A_m^\dagger A_n, \rho\right\}\right)$ | eq.2.3 |

where $\{A_m\}$ are arbitrary operators and h is a positive semidefinite matrix. The latter is a strict requirement to ensure the dynamics is trace-preserving and completely positive. The number of $A_m$ operators is arbitrary, and they do not have to satisfy any special properties. But if the system is $N$-dimensional, it can be shown that the master equation can be fully described by a set of $N^2-1$ operators, provided they form a basis for the space of operators.

The general form is not in fact more general, and can be reduced to the special form. Since the matrix h is positive semidefinite, it can be diagonalized with a unitary transformation u:

| $$u^\dagger h u = \begin{bmatrix} \gamma_1 & 0        & \cdots & 0 \\ 0        & \gamma_2 & \cdots & 0 \\ \vdots   & \vdots   & \ddots & \vdots \\ 0        & 0        & \cdots & \gamma_{N^2-1} \end{bmatrix}$$ | eq.2.4 |

where the eigenvalues γ_{i} are non-negative. If we define another orthonormal operator basis

| $L_i = \sum_j u_{ji} A_j$ | eq.2.5 |

This reduces the master equation to the same form as before:

| $$\dot\rho=-{i\over\hbar}[H,\rho]+\sum_{i}^{} \gamma_i\left(L_i\rho L_i^\dagger -\frac{1}{2} \left\{L_i^\dagger L_i, \rho\right\} \right).$$ | eq.2.6 |

=== Quantum dynamical semigroup ===
The maps generated by a Lindbladian for various times are collectively referred to as a quantum dynamical semigroup—a family of quantum dynamical maps $\phi_t$ on the space of density matrices indexed by a single time parameter $t \ge 0$ that obey the semigroup property

| $\phi_s(\phi_t(\rho)) = \phi_{t+s}(\rho) , \qquad t,s \ge 0.$ | eq.2.7 |

The Lindblad equation can be obtained by

| $\mathcal{L}(\rho) = \mathrm{lim}_{\Delta t \to 0} \frac{\phi_{\Delta t}(\rho)-\phi_0(\rho)}{\Delta t}$ | eq.2.8 |

which, by the linearity of $\phi_t$, is a linear superoperator. The semigroup can be recovered as

| $\phi_{t+s}(\rho) = e^{\mathcal{L}s} \phi_t(\rho).$ | eq.2.9 |

=== Invariance properties ===
The Lindblad equation is invariant under any unitary transformation v of Lindblad operators and constants,

| $\sqrt{\gamma_i} L_i \to \sqrt{\gamma_i'} L_i' = \sum_{j} v_{ij} \sqrt{\gamma_j} L_j ,$ | eq.2.10 |

and also under the inhomogeneous transformation

| $L_i \to L_i' = L_i + a_i I,$ | eq.2.11 |

| $H \to H' = H + \frac{1}{2i} \sum_j \gamma_j \left (a_j^* L_j - a_j L_j^\dagger \right ) +bI,$ | eq.2.12 |

where a_{i} are complex numbers and b is a real number. However, the first transformation destroys the orthonormality of the operators L_{i} (unless all the γ_{i} are equal) and the second transformation destroys the tracelessness. Therefore, up to degeneracies among the γ_{i}, the L_{i} of the diagonal form of the Lindblad equation are uniquely determined by the dynamics so long as we require them to be orthonormal and traceless.

=== Heisenberg picture ===
The Lindblad-type evolution of the density matrix in the Schrödinger picture can be equivalently described in the Heisenberg picture using the following (diagonalized) equation of motion for each quantum observable X:

| $\dot{X} = \frac{i}{\hbar} [H, X] +\sum_i \gamma_i \left(L_i^\dagger X L_i -\frac{1}{2}\left\{L_i^\dagger L_i, X\right\} \right).$ | eq.2.13 |

A similar equation describes the time evolution of the expectation values of observables, given by the Ehrenfest theorem. Corresponding to the trace-preserving property of the Schrödinger picture Lindblad equation, the Heisenberg picture equation is unital, i.e. it preserves the identity operator.

== Physical derivation ==
The Lindblad master equation describes the evolution of various types of open quantum systems, e.g. a system weakly coupled to a Markovian reservoir. Note that the H appearing in the equation is not necessarily equal to the bare system Hamiltonian, but may also incorporate effective unitary dynamics arising from the system-environment interaction.

A heuristic derivation, e.g., in the notes by John Preskill, begins with a more general form of an open quantum system and converts it into Lindblad form by making the Markovian assumption and expanding in small time. A more physically motivated standard treatment covers three common types of derivations of the Lindbladian starting from a Hamiltonian acting on both the system and environment: the weak coupling limit (described in detail below), the low density approximation, and the singular coupling limit. Each of these relies on specific physical assumptions regarding, e.g., correlation functions of the environment. For example, in the weak coupling limit derivation, one typically assumes that (a) correlations of the system with the environment develop slowly, (b) excitations of the environment caused by system decay quickly, and (c) terms which are fast-oscillating when compared to the system timescale of interest can be neglected. These three approximations are called Born, Markov, and rotating wave, respectively.

The weak-coupling limit derivation assumes a quantum system with a finite number of degrees of freedom coupled to a bath containing an infinite number of degrees of freedom. The system and bath each possess a Hamiltonian written in terms of operators acting only on the respective subspace of the total Hilbert space. These Hamiltonians govern the internal dynamics of the uncoupled system and bath. There is a third Hamiltonian that contains products of system and bath operators, thus coupling the system and bath. The most general form of this Hamiltonian is

| $H= H_S + H_B + H_{BS} \,$ | eq.3.1 |

The dynamics of the entire system can be described by the Liouville equation of motion, $\dot{\chi}=-i[H,\chi]$. This equation, containing an infinite number of degrees of freedom, is impossible to solve analytically except in very particular cases. What's more, under certain approximations, the bath degrees of freedom need not be considered, and an effective master equation can be derived in terms of the system density matrix, $\rho=\operatorname{tr}_B \chi$. The problem can be analyzed more easily by moving into the interaction picture, defined by the unitary transformation $\tilde{M}= U_0MU_0^\dagger$, where $M$ is an arbitrary operator, and $U_0=e^{i(H_S+H_B)t}$. Also note that $U(t,t_0)$ is the total unitary operator of the entire system. It is straightforward to confirm that the Liouville equation becomes

| $\dot{\tilde{\chi}}=-i[\tilde{H}_{BS},\tilde{\chi}] \,$ | eq.3.2 |

where the Hamiltonian $\tilde{H}_{BS}=e^{i(H_S+H_B)t} H_{BS} e^{-i(H_S+H_B)t}$ is explicitly time dependent. Also, according to the interaction picture, $\tilde{\chi}= U_{BS}(t,t_0)\chi U_{BS}^\dagger (t,t_0)$, where $U_{BS}=U_0 ^\dagger U(t,t_0)$. This equation can be integrated directly to give

| $\tilde{\chi}(t)=\tilde{\chi}(0) -i\int^t_0 dt' [\tilde{H}_{BS}(t'),\tilde{\chi}(t')]$ | eq.3.3 |

This implicit equation for $\tilde{\chi}$ can be substituted back into the Liouville equation to obtain an exact differo-integral equation

| $\dot{\tilde{\chi}}=-i[\tilde{H}_{BS}(t),\tilde{\chi}(0)] - \int^t_0 dt' [\tilde{H}_{BS}(t),[\tilde{H}_{BS}(t'),\tilde{\chi}(t')]]$ | eq.3.4 |

We proceed with the derivation by assuming the interaction is initiated at $t=0$, and at that time there are no correlations between the system and the bath. This implies that the initial condition is factorable as $\chi(0) = \rho(0) R_0$, where $R_0$ is the density operator of the bath initially.

Tracing over the bath degrees of freedom, $\operatorname{tr}_R \tilde{\chi} = \tilde{\rho}$, of the aforementioned differo-integral equation yields

| $\dot{\tilde{\rho}}= - \int^t_0 dt' \operatorname{tr}_R\{[\tilde{H}_{BS}(t),[\tilde{H}_{BS}(t'),\tilde{\chi}(t')]]\}$ | eq.3.5 |

This equation is exact for the time dynamics of the system density matrix but requires full knowledge of the dynamics of the bath degrees of freedom. A simplifying assumption called the Born approximation rests on the largeness of the bath and the relative weakness of the coupling, which is to say the coupling of the system to the bath should not significantly alter the bath eigenstates. In this case the full density matrix is factorable for all times as $\tilde{\chi}(t)=\tilde{\rho}(t)R_0$. The master equation becomes

| $\dot{\tilde{\rho}}= - \int^t_0 dt' \operatorname{tr}_R\{[\tilde{H}_{BS}(t),[\tilde{H}_{BS}(t'),\tilde{\rho}(t')R_0]]\}$ | eq.3.6 |

The equation is now explicit in the system degrees of freedom, but is very difficult to solve. A final assumption is the Born-Markov approximation that the time derivative of the density matrix depends only on its current state, and not on its past. This assumption is valid under fast bath dynamics, wherein correlations within the bath are lost extremely quickly, and amounts to replacing $\rho(t')\rightarrow \rho(t)$ on the right hand side of the equation.

| $\dot{\tilde{\rho}}= - \int^t_0 dt' \operatorname{tr}_R\{[\tilde{H}_{BS}(t),[\tilde{H}_{BS}(t'),\tilde{\rho}(t)R_0]]\}$ | eq.3.7 |

If the interaction Hamiltonian is assumed to have the form

| $H_{BS}=\sum_i \alpha_i \Gamma_i$ | eq.3.8 |

for system operators $\alpha_i$ and bath operators $\Gamma_i$ then $\tilde{H}_{BS}=\sum_i \tilde{\alpha}_i \tilde{\Gamma}_i$. The master equation becomes

| $\dot{\tilde{\rho}}= - \sum_{i,j} \int^t_0 dt' \operatorname{tr}_R\{[\tilde{\alpha}_i(t) \tilde{\Gamma}_i(t),[\tilde{\alpha}_j(t') \tilde{\Gamma}_j(t'),\tilde{\rho}(t)R_0]]\}$ | eq.3.9 |

which can be expanded as

| $\dot{\tilde{\rho}} = - \sum_{i,j} \int^t_0 dt' \left[ \left( \tilde{\alpha}_i(t) \tilde{\alpha}_j(t') \tilde{\rho}(t) - \tilde{\alpha}_i(t) \tilde{\rho}(t) \tilde{\alpha}_j(t') \right) \langle\tilde{\Gamma}_i(t)\tilde{\Gamma}_j(t')\rangle + \left( \tilde{\rho}(t) \tilde{\alpha}_j(t') \tilde{\alpha}_i(t) - \tilde{\alpha}_j(t') \tilde{\rho}(t) \tilde{\alpha}_i(t) \right) \langle\tilde{\Gamma}_j(t')\tilde{\Gamma}_i(t)\rangle \right]$ | eq.3.10 |

The expectation values $\langle \Gamma_i\Gamma_j \rangle=\operatorname{tr}\{\Gamma_i\Gamma_jR_0\}$ are with respect to the bath degrees of freedom. By assuming rapid decay of these correlations (ideally $\langle \Gamma_i(t)\Gamma_j(t') \rangle \propto \delta(t-t')$), above form of the Lindblad superoperator L is achieved.

== Examples ==
In the simplest case, there is just one jump operator $F$ and no unitary evolution. In this case, the Lindblad equation is

| $\mathcal{L}(\rho) ={F\rho F^\dagger} -\frac{1}{2}\left( F^\dagger F \rho + \rho F^\dagger F\right)$ | eq.4.1 |

This case is often used in quantum optics to model either absorption or emission of photons from a reservoir.

To model both absorption and emission, one would need a jump operator for each. This leads to the most common Lindblad equation describing the damping of a quantum harmonic oscillator (representing e.g. a Fabry–Perot cavity) coupled to a thermal bath, with jump operators:

$$\begin{align}
F_1 &= a, & \gamma_1 &= \tfrac{\gamma}{2} \left(\overline{n}+1 \right ),\\
F_2 &= a^{\dagger}, & \gamma_2 &= \tfrac{\gamma}{2} \overline{n}.
\end{align}$$

Here $\overline{n}$ is the mean number of excitations in the reservoir damping the oscillator and γ is the decay rate.

To model the quantum harmonic oscillator Hamiltonian with frequency $\omega_c$ of the photons, we can add a further unitary evolution:

| $\dot{\rho}=-i[\omega_c a^\dagger a,\rho]+\gamma_1\mathcal{D}[F_1](\rho) + \gamma_2\mathcal{D}[F_2](\rho).$ | eq.4.2 |

Additional Lindblad operators can be included to model various forms of dephasing and vibrational relaxation. These methods have been incorporated into grid-based density matrix propagation methods.

== See also ==
- Quantum master equation
- Redfield equation
- Open quantum system
- Quantum jump method
- Sokhotski–Plemelj theorem § Heitler function
