= Andrzej Kossakowski =

Polish physicist (1938–2021)

Andrzej Marek Kossakowski
- Born: 20 February 1938; Lviv, Second Polish Republic
- Died: 31 January 2021 (aged 82); Toruń, Poland
- Citizenship: Polish
- Education: Nicolaus Copernicus University
- Known for: Lindbladian
- Scientific career
- Fields: Quantum informatics, Theoretical physics

Andrzej Marek Kossakowski (20 February 1938 – 31 January 2021) was a Polish theoretical physicist and a professor at the Nicolaus Copernicus University. He was best known for his work on open quantum systems.

== Education ==
Andrzej Kossakowski was born on 20 February 1938 in Lwów, Poland (now Lviv, in Ukraine). He attended a primary and secondary school in Sopot.

In the years 1955-1960, he studied physics at the Nicolaus Copernicus University in Toruń. Right after graduation, he got a job at the same university, first as an assistant, then as a senior assistant in 1962. In 1966, he defended his PhD thesis titled On the entropy increase law in informational thermodynamics of density operators, written under the supervision of Roman Stanisław Ingarden during the scientific internship in the Institute of Theoretical Physics at the University of Wrocław in the academic year 1964/1965.

== Academic career ==
In 1967, Kossakowski was employed at the Nicolaus Copernicus University as an assistant professor. In 1971, he was habilitated with a thesis titled Informational decision scheme in statistical quantum mechanics. He was promoted to docent in 1972, and after three years he became an associate director of the Institute of Physics in didactics. He became a full professor in 1992.

Andrzej Kossakowski lectured at the universities in Stuttgart (1973) Austin (1974), Milan (1975), Essen (1989), Leuven (1991), Naples, Santiago de Chile, and Tokyo.

He died in Toruń on 31 January 2021.

== Recognition ==
In 2019, Kossakowski received the Prize of the Foundation for Polish Science in the field of mathematics, physics, and engineering for his works on the theory of open quantum systems.

== Most influential publications ==
- Gorini, V.; Kossakowski, A.; Sudarshan, E.C.G. (1976). "Completely positive semigroups of N-level systems". J. Math. Phys. 17 (5): 821. Bibcode:1976JMP....17..821G. doi:10.1063/1.522979.
- Kossakowski, A. (1972). "On quantum statistical mechanics of non-Hamiltonian systems". Rep. Math. Phys. 3 (4): 247. Bibcode:1972RpMP....3..247K. doi:10.1016/0034-4877(72)90010-9.
