= Redfield equation =

Markovian master equation of a quantum system weakly coupled to its environment

In quantum mechanics, the Redfield equation is a Markovian master equation that describes the time evolution of the reduced density matrix ρ of a strongly coupled quantum system that is weakly coupled to an environment. The equation is named after Alfred G. Redfield, who first applied it, doing so for nuclear magnetic resonance spectroscopy. It is also known as the Redfield relaxation theory.

There is a close connection to the Lindblad master equation. If a so-called secular approximation is performed, where only certain resonant interactions with the environment are retained, every Redfield equation transforms into a master equation of Lindblad type.

Redfield equations are trace-preserving and correctly produce a thermalized state for asymptotic propagation. However, in contrast to Lindblad equations, Redfield equations do not guarantee a positive time evolution of the density matrix. That is, it is possible to get negative populations during the time evolution. The Redfield equation approaches the correct dynamics for sufficiently weak coupling to the environment.

The general form of the Redfield equation is

$$\frac{\partial}{\partial t} \rho(t) = -\frac{i}{\hbar} [H, \rho(t)] -\frac{1}{\hbar^2} \sum_m  [ S_m, (\Lambda_m \rho(t) - \rho(t) \Lambda_m^\dagger)]$$

where $H$ is the hermitian Hamiltonian, and the $S_m, \Lambda_m$ are operators that describe the coupling to the environment, and $[A,B] = AB - BA$ is the commutation bracket. The explicit form is given in the derivation below.

== Derivation ==
Consider a quantum system coupled to an environment with a total Hamiltonian of $H_\text{tot} = H + H_\text{int} + H_\text{env}$. Furthermore, we assume that the interaction Hamiltonian can be written as $H_\text{int} = \sum_n S_n E_n$, where the $S_n$ act only on the system degrees of freedom, the $E_n$ only on the environment degrees of freedom.

The starting point of Redfield theory is the Nakajima–Zwanzig equation with $\mathcal{P}$ projecting on the equilibrium density operator of the environment and $\mathcal{Q}$ treated up to second order. An equivalent derivation starts with second-order perturbation theory in the interaction $H_\text{int}$. In both cases, the resulting equation of motion for the density operator in the interaction picture (with $H_{0,S} = H + H_\text{env}$) is

$$\frac{\partial}{\partial t} \rho_{\rm I}(t) = -\frac{1}{\hbar^2} \sum_{m,n} \int_{t_0}^t dt' \biggl(C_{mn}(t-t') \Bigl[S_{m,\mathrm{I}}(t), S_{n,\mathrm{I}}(t') \rho_{\rm I}(t')\Bigr]$$
$$- C_{mn}^\ast(t-t') \Bigl[S_{m,\mathrm{I}}(t), \rho_{\rm I}(t') S_{n,\mathrm{I}}(t')\Bigr]\biggr)$$

Here, $t_0$ is some initial time, where the total state of the system and bath is assumed to be factorized, and we have introduced the bath correlation function $C_{mn}(t) = \text{tr}(E_{m,\mathrm{I}}(t) E_{n} \rho_\text{env,eq})$ in terms of the density operator of the environment in thermal equilibrium, $\rho_\text{env,eq}$.

This equation is non-local in time: To get the derivative of the reduced density operator at time t, we need its values at all past times. As such, it cannot be easily solved. To construct an approximate solution, note that there are two time scales: a typical relaxation time $\tau_r$ that gives the time scale on which the environment affects the system time evolution, and the coherence time of the environment, $\tau_c$ that gives the typical time scale on which the correlation functions decay. If the relation

$$\tau_c \ll \tau_r$$

holds, then the integrand becomes approximately zero before the interaction-picture density operator changes significantly. In this case, the so-called Markov approximation $\rho_{\rm I}(t') \approx \rho_{\rm I}(t)$ holds. If we also move $t_0 \to -\infty$ and change the integration variable $t' \to \tau = t - t'$, we end up with the Redfield master equation

$$\frac{\partial}{\partial t} \rho_{\rm I}(t) = -\frac{1}{\hbar^2} \sum_{m,n} \int_0^\infty d\tau \biggl(C_{mn}(\tau) \Bigl[S_{m,\mathrm{I}}(t), S_{n,\mathrm{I}}(t-\tau) \rho_{\rm I}(t)\Bigr]$$
$$- C_{mn}^\ast(\tau) \Bigl[S_{m,\mathrm{I}}(t), \rho_{\rm I}(t) S_{n,\mathrm{I}}(t-\tau)\Bigr]\biggr)$$

We can simplify this equation considerably if we use the shortcut $\Lambda_m = \sum_n \int_0^\infty d\tau C_{mn}(\tau) S_{n,\mathrm{I}}(t-\tau)$. In the Schrödinger picture, the equation then reads

$$\frac{\partial}{\partial t} \rho(t) = -\frac{i}{\hbar} [H, \rho(t)] -\frac{1}{\hbar^2} \sum_m [ S_m, \Lambda_m \rho(t) - \rho(t) \Lambda_m^\dagger]$$

== Secular approximation ==
Secular (Latin: saeculum, lit. 'century') approximation is an approximation valid for long times $t$. The time evolution of the Redfield relaxation tensor is neglected as the Redfield equation describes weak coupling to the environment. Therefore, it is assumed that the relaxation tensor changes slowly in time, and it can be assumed constant for the duration of the interaction described by the interaction Hamiltonian. In general, the time evolution of the reduced density matrix can be written for the element $ab$ as

$\frac{\partial}{\partial t}\rho_{ab}(t) = -i\omega_{ab}\rho_{ab}(t) - \sum_{cd}\mathcal{R}_{abcd}\rho_{cd}(t)$	1

where $\mathcal{R}$ is the time-independent Redfield relaxation tensor.

Given that the actual coupling to the environment is weak (but non-negligible), the Redfield tensor is a small perturbation of the system Hamiltonian and the solution can be written as

$$\rho_{ab}(t) = e^{-i\omega_{ab}t}{\rho}_{ab,\mathrm{I}}(t)$$

where $\rho_{\rm I}(t)$ is not constant but slowly changing amplitude reflecting the weak coupling to the environment. This is also a form of the interaction picture, hence the index "I". (Note: The interaction picture describes the evolution of the density matrix in a "frame of reference" where the changes due to Hamiltonian $H_0$ are not manifested. It is essentially the same transformation as entering a rotating frame of reference to solve a problem of combined rotating motion in classical mechanics. The interaction picture then describes only the envelope of the time evolution of the density matrix where only the more subtle effects of the perturbation Hamiltonian manifest. The mathematical formula for a transformation from the Schrödinger picture to the interaction picture is given by $\psi_{\rm I}(t)=U^{\dagger}(t)\psi_{\rm S}(t)=e^{iH_0t/\hbar}\psi_{\rm S}(t)$, which is the same form as this equation.)

Taking a derivative of the $\rho_{\rm I}(t)$ and substituting the equation (1) for $\frac{\partial}{\partial t}\rho_{ab}(t)$, we are left with only the relaxation part of the equation

$$\frac{\partial}{\partial t}\rho_{ab,\mathrm{I}}(t) = - \sum_{cd}\mathcal{R_{abcd}}e^{i\omega_{ab}t-i\omega_{cd}t}\rho_{cd,\mathrm{I}}(t)$$.

We can integrate this equation on condition that the interaction picture of the reduced density matrix $\rho_{\rm I}(t)$ changes slowly in time (which is true if $\mathcal{R}$ is small), then $\rho_{ab,\mathrm{I}}(t) \approx \rho_{ab,\mathrm{I}}(0)$, getting

$$\rho_{ab,\mathrm{I}}(t) = \rho_{ab,\mathrm{I}}(0) - \sum_{cd}\int_0^td\tau\mathcal{R_{abcd}}e^{i\omega_{ab}\tau-i\omega_{cd}\tau}\rho_{cd,\mathrm{I}}(t) = \rho_{ab,\mathrm{I}}(0) - \sum_{cd}\mathcal{R_{abcd}} \frac{(e^{i\Delta\omega t} - 1)}{i\Delta\omega} \rho_{cd,\mathrm{I}}(t)$$

where $\Delta\omega = \omega_{ab} - \omega_{cd}$.

In the limit of $\Delta\omega$ approaching zero, the fraction $\frac{(e^{i\Delta\omega t} - 1)}{i\Delta\omega}$ approaches $t$, therefore the contribution of one element of the reduced density matrix to another element is proportional to time (and therefore dominates for long times $t$). In case $\Delta\omega$ is not approaching zero, the contribution of one element of the reduced density matrix to another oscillates with an amplitude proportional to $\frac{1}{\Delta\omega}$ (and therefore is negligible for long times $t$). It is therefore appropriate to neglect any contribution from non-diagonal elements ($cd$) to other non-diagonal elements ($ab$) and from a non-diagonal elements ($cd$) to diagonal elements ($aa$, $a=b$), since the only case when frequencies of different modes are equal is the case of random degeneracy. The only elements left in the Redfield tensor to evaluate after the Secular approximation are therefore:

- $\mathcal{R}_{aabb}$, the transfer of population from one state to another (from $b$ to $a$);
- $\mathcal{R}_{aaaa}$, the depopulation constant of state $a$; and
- $\mathcal{R}_{abab}$, the pure dephasing of the element $\rho_{ab}(t)$ (dephasing of coherence).
