= Alfred G. Redfield =

American molecular biologist and physicist (1929–2019)

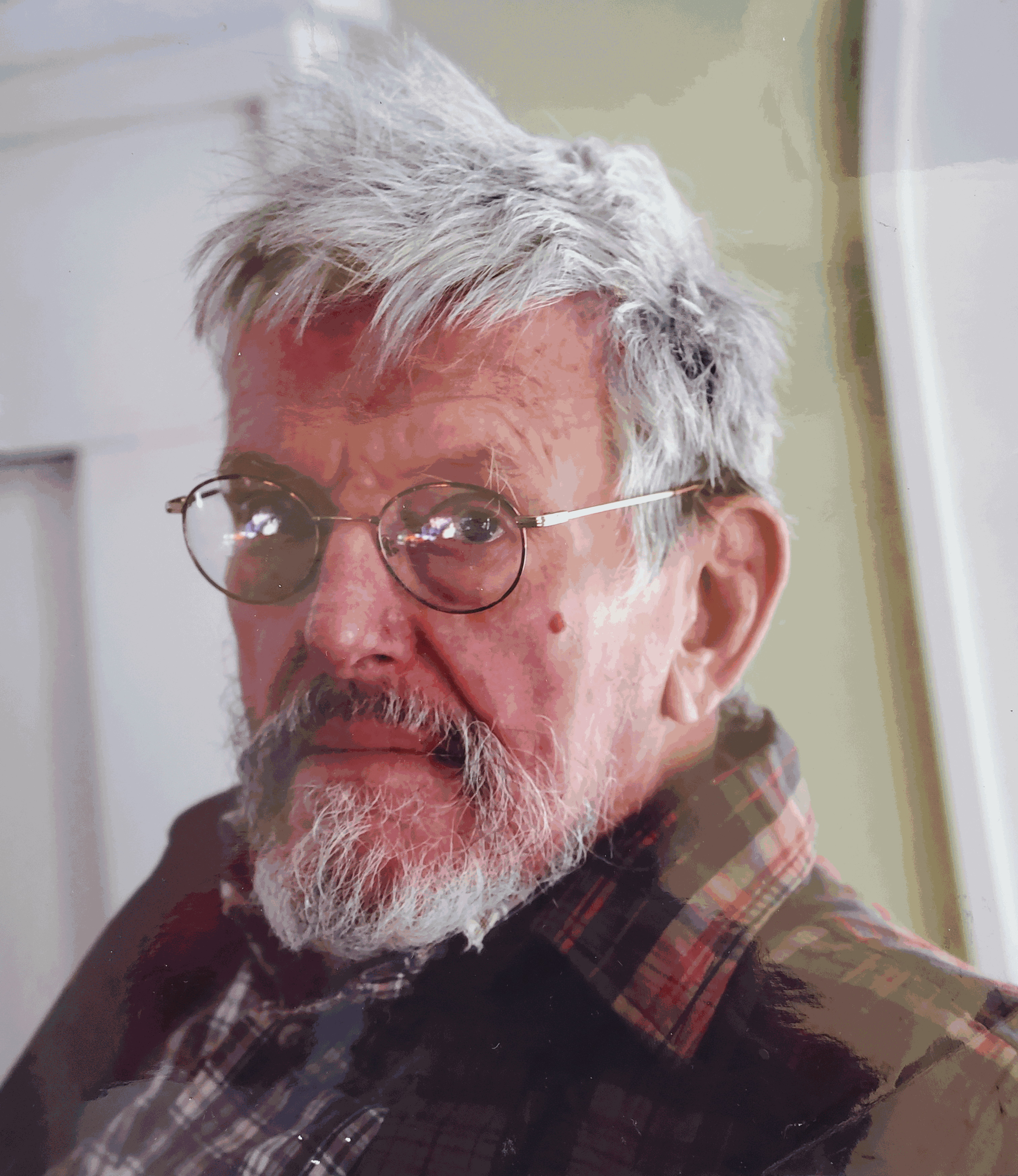
- Redfield in his mid-eighties
- Born: Alfred Guillou Redfield; March 11, 1929. Milton, Massachusetts, U.S.
- Died: July 24, 2019 (aged 90); Alameda, California, United States
- Education: Harvard College (BA), University of Illinois, Urbana-Champaign (MS, PhD)
- Known for: Redfield equation
- Scientific career
- Fields: Physics; Molecular biology
- Workplaces: University of Illinois (PhD, 1953); Harvard College; IBM Watson Lab; University of California, Berkeley; Brandeis University
- Thesis: Hall Effect in Insulating Photoconductors (1953)

Alfred Guillou Redfield (March 11, 1929 – July 24, 2019) was an American physicist and biochemist. In 1955 he published the Redfield relaxation theory, effectively moving the practice of nuclear magnetic resonance (NMR) from the realm of classical physics to the realm of semiclassical physics. He is known for the development of Redfield equation. He continued to find novel magnetic resonance applications to solve real-world problems throughout his life.

Redfield earned degrees at Harvard College (BA 1950, Master's 1952) and the University of Illinois, Urbana-Champaign (Ph.D. 1953). As a postdoc, he worked with Nicolaas Bloembergen at Harvard, where he first published the Redfield relaxation theory. IBM Watson Scientific Computing Laboratory hired him in 1955 and he taught at Columbia. While there, he published his most important work, the Redfield Relaxation Equation.

In 1971 he published experiments that helped to draw the veil of H₂O molecules away from hitherto invisible atoms in large, biological molecules. He continued to innovate specific NMR techniques to view the molecular structure of nucleic acids and enzymes. Beginning in 1996, the NMR Field Cycling community began to realize that slow NMR had an advantage over X-ray crystallography for observing large, biological molecule (macromolecule) dynamics, which can't be captured by high-energy NMR or crystallography. In 1996 he released an article exploring field cycling as a way to study macromolecules in more detail. He published his first article using the phosphorus isotope ^{31}P to probe phospholipids in 2004.

He became a fellow of the American Physical Society in 1959, was elected to the National Academy of Sciences in 1979, and was named a Fellow of the American Academy of Arts and Sciences (AAAS) in 1983. Redfield received the Max Delbruck Prize from the American Physical Society in 2006. In 2007 he was recognized with the Russell Varian Prize for contributing the Redfield Relaxation Theory to the field of nuclear magnetic resonance.

Redfield is descended from a family of pioneering scientists, including his father, Alfred C. Redfield, his second great-grandfather, William Charles Redfield, and his great-grandfather, the naturalist John Howard Redfield.

== Career and research ==
=== Early work on NMR resonance saturation in solids and Redfield relaxation theory ===
==== Earliest research ====
Charles P. Slichter wrote that "In 1955, Redfield showed that the conventional theory of saturation did not properly account for the experimental facts of nuclear resonance in solids...[Redfield] showed that the conventional approach essentially defied the second law of thermodynamics."

Redfield studied NMR with Charles Pence Slichter, assisting with early superconductivity experiments at University of Illinois, Urbana and published the Redfield Theory as a postdoc under Nicolaas Bloembergen at Harvard. At first he studied electron removal in argon, hydrogen and crypton, and the movement of electrons in photoconductors, including his doctoral thesis on the Hall effect in diamonds and salt crystals.

After his breakthrough work on relaxation theory, he continued to produce papers on nuclear spin relaxation.

==== Discovery of the Redfield relaxation theory and equation ====
Redfield's original article published in the IBM Journal in 1957, and then in the first issue of Advanced Magnetic Resonance in 1965, "The Theory of Relaxation Processes" explained observations that molecules excited with RF in a magnetic field did not relax as expected in terms of classical thermodynamics but could be explained in terms of quantum physics, yielding a semi-classic explanation of nuclear spin in metals. The theory continues to be useful not only in NMR but in optics and computational quantum mechanics as well.

The theory streamlined analysis of atomic relationships and explained observations that NMR scientists had not fully theorized. The theory helped explain spin temperature, rotating frame, nuclear spin relaxation, and predicted adiabatic demagnetization and remagnetization in a spin-locked state, and short correlation time.

=== General spectroscopy ===
Redfield's interests included discovering techniques to advance the practice of NMR for the purpose of nuclear induction spectroscopy, super conducting magnets, current regulator for inductive loads, practical demonstration and proof of theory, nuclear spin thermodynamics, rare spins in solids, two-dimensional NMR efficiencies, computing and data processing, isotope labeling, nuclear Overhauser effect, proteins and their macromolecules in solution, phospholipid approaches. He devised a field cycling device to rapidly move a sample in and out of the field that became a precursor to modern fast field cycling instrumentation.

=== Solid state work ===
Redfield's NMR career began with work on solids, like metals and superconductors. This work later proved to be useful in the study of the physical and motional relationships between protons in large biological molecules, called macromolecules.

=== Aqueous state and biochemical work ===
In 1972, along with Raj V. Gupta, Redfield found a way to cancel out the overwhelming signature spectrum of H₂O in biological samples, which allowed the visualization of molecular biological structure in blood cells, nucleic acids, enzymes, and phospholipids. He continued to pioneer aqueous techniques using deuterium.

=== General biochemical work ===
Redfield continued to develop new techniques to study the structure of protein molecules in solution, looking at cancer cells with NMR, the shell of the SARS virus cell and at amino acids. Later, using multiple resonances via shuttle and specially prepared samples, he investigated molecular activity in phospholipid vesicles.

=== Nucleic acids work ===
Redfield explored the structure and properties of tRNA and related enzymes.

=== Enzymology and phospholipid membrane work ===
Redfield explored the function and properties of cell walls.

=== Shuttle invention ===
In 2003, Redfield developed a shuttle to move a sample in and out of field rapidly. It was the first to be used on a standard high-field NMR spectrometer.

== Biography ==
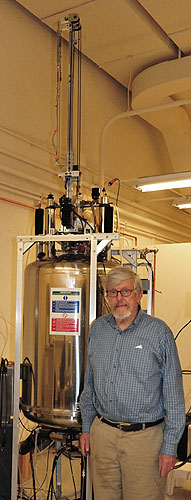
Device to rapidly shuttle a sample in and out of field.

=== Early years (1929-1945) ===
Redfield was born in Boston, Massachusetts. He grew up in Cambridge and Woods Hole, where the oceanographic institute employed his father, Alfred C. Redfield.

=== Harvard and Urbana (1946-1953) ===
He graduated from Harvard in 1950 with a B.A., then received his M.S. and Ph.D. degrees in physics from the University of Illinois in 1952 and 1953.

=== Brandeis (1972-2019) ===
In 1972, Redfield joined Brandeis University with a joint appointment in physics and biochemistry. He designed his own spectrometer and apparatus that was the first to specifically target biological systems. The apparatus was similar in design to later commercial units, but because it was housed on shelves, it was easy to change out components and calibrate in many ways. The processing software and pulse sequences were original, and pulse sequences were selected by a switch. The pulse lengths were adjusted with an analog pot for S/N and selective pulse water suppression. He had one physics postdoc and one chemistry or biochemistry postdoc in his lab.

In 1979, Redfield was elected to the National Academy of Sciences, and in 1983, he was named a Fellow in the American Academy of Arts and Sciences. He was given the Max Delbrück Prize by the American Physical Society in 2006.

== Death ==
Redfield died on July 24, 2019, in Alameda, California at the age of 90.

== NAAS selected bibliography ==
- 1955 Nuclear magnetic resonance saturation and rotary saturation in solids. Physical Review 98(6):1787–1809.
- 1959 With A. G. Anderson. Nuclear spin-lattice relaxation in metals. Physical Review 116(3):583–591.
- 1963. Pure nuclear electric quadrupole resonance in impure copper. Physical Review 130(2):589–595.
- 1963 With M. Eisenstadt. Nuclear spin relaxation by translational diffusion in solids. Physical Review 132(2):635–643. Pure nuclear electric quadrupole resonance in impure copper. Physical Review 130(2):589–595.
- 1965 The theory of relaxation processes. In Advances in Magnetic and Optical Resonance, pp. 1–32.
- 1967 Local-field mapping in mixed-state superconducting vanadium by nuclear magnetic resonance. Physical Review 162(2):367–374.
- 1969 Nuclear spin thermodynamics in the rotating frame. Science 164(3883):1015–1023.
- 1970 With R. K. Gupta. Double nuclear magnetic resonance observation of electron exchange between ferri- and ferrocytochrome c. Science 169(3951):1204–1206.
- 1971 With H. E. Bleich. Higher resolution NMR of rare spins in solids [1]. The Journal of Chemical Physics 55(11):5405–5406.
- 1971 With R. K. Gupta. Pulsed Fourier transform nuclear magnetic resonance spectrometer. In Advances in Magnetic and Optical Resonance, pp. 81–115.
- 1973 With A. Z. Genack. Nuclear spin diffusion and its thermodynamic quenching in the field gradients of a Type-II superconductor. Physical Review Letters 31(19):1204–1207.
- 1975 With S. D. Kunz and E. K. Ralph. Dynamic range in Fourier transform proton magnetic resonance. Journal of Magnetic Resonance 19(1):114–117.
- 1978 With J. D. Stoesz and D. Malinowski. Cross relaxation and spin diffusion effects on the proton NMR of biopolymers in H₂O. Solvent saturation and chemical exchange in superoxide dismutase. FEBS Letters 91(2):320–324. 11 ALFRED REDFIELD
- 1979 With P. D. Johnston and N. Figueroa. Real-time solvent exchange studies of the imino and amino protons of yeast phenylalanine transfer RNA by Fourier transform NMR. Proceedings of the National Academy of Sciences U.S.A. 76(7):3130–3134.
- 1983 Stimulated echo NMR spectra and their use for heteronuclear two-dimensional shift correlation. Chemical Physics Letters 96(5):537–540.
- 1986 With M. A. Weiss and R. H. Griffey. Isotope-detected 1 H NMR studies of proteins: A general strategy for editing interproton nuclear Overhauser effects by heteronuclear decoupling, with application to phage λ repressor. Proceedings of the National Academy of Sciences, U.S.A. 83(5):1325–1329.
- 1987 With L. P. McIntosh, et al. Proton NMR measurements of bacteriophage T4 lysozyme aided by 15N isotopic labeling: Structural and dynamic studies of larger proteins. Proceedings of the National Academy of Sciences, U.S.A. 84(5):1244–1248.
- 1989 With S. C. Burk, M. Z. Papastavros, and F. McCormick. Identification of resonances from an oncogenic activating locus of human N-RAS-encoded p21 protein using isotope-edited NMR. Proceedings of the National Academy of Sciences, U.S.A. 86(3):817–820.
- 2009. With Shi, X. et al. Modulation of Bacillus thuringiensis phosphatidylinositolspecific phospholipase C activity by mutations in the putative dimerization interface. Journal of Biological Chemistry 284(23):15607-15618.
- 2009 With M. Pu, J. Feng, and M. F. Roberts. Enzymology with a spin-labeled phospholipase C: Soluble substrate binding by 31P NMR from 0.005 to 11.7 T. Biochemistry 48(35):8282–8284.

With X. Shi, et al. Modulation of Bacillus thuringiensis phosphatidylinositol-specific phospholipase C activity by mutations in the putative dimerization interface. Journal of Biological Chemistry 284(23):15607–15618.

- 2016 With M. M. Rosenberg, M. F. Roberts, and L. Hedstrom. Substrate and cofactor dynamics on guanosine monophosphate reductase probed by high resolution field cycling 31P NMR relaxometry. Journal of Biological Chemistry 291(44):22988–22998.
