= Göran Lindblad (physicist) =

Swedish theoretical physicist

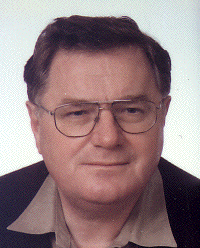
- Born: 9 July 1940; Boden, Sweden
- Died: 30 November 2022 (aged 82)
- Known for: Lindblad equation data-processing inequality for quantum relative entropy
- Scientific career
- Fields: Theoretical physics
- Workplaces: KTH Royal Institute of Technology
- Thesis: The concepts of information and entropy applied to the measurement process in quantum theory and statistical mechanics (1974)
- Doctoral advisor: Bengt Nagel

Göran Lindblad (9 July 1940 – 30 November 2022) was a Swedish theoretical physicist and a professor at the KTH Royal Institute of Technology, Stockholm. He made major foundational contributions in mathematical physics and quantum information theory, having to do with open quantum systems, entropy inequalities, and quantum measurements. The Lindblad equation in open quantum systems is named after him.

== Personal life ==
Lindblad was born in Boden, Sweden on July 9, 1940, and grew up in Örebro, Sweden. Besides physics, he took an interest in history. He died on November 30, 2022, near his home in Johanneshov, Sweden.

== Career ==
Lindblad spent his entire career, starting from his undergraduate days, at the KTH Royal Institute of Technology. He defended his PhD thesis, entitled "The concepts of information and entropy applied to the measurement process in quantum theory and statistical mechanics," on May 29, 1974. His PhD thesis summarized the contents of some important contributions to quantum information theory, including his proof of the data-processing inequality for quantum relative entropy, communicated in a series of three research publications.

Shortly after his PhD thesis work, he derived his most well known scientific contribution, what is known as the Lindblad equation. As the Schrödinger equation describes the evolution of a closed quantum system, the Lindblad equation is a generalization, describing the evolution of an open quantum system, in which a system of interest is interacting with an uncontrollable environment. The Lindblad equation is a significant theoretical contribution and is widely used in many fields of physics, including quantum optics and condensed matter. It is also now the most common method for describing noise that affects various quantum technologies, in the domains of quantum communication and computation.

He published a monograph on two related conceptual problems in the foundations of statistical mechanics, concerning the derivation of the irreversibility of the observed macroscopic behavior from the reversible microscopic laws of motion and the definition of an entropy function on non-equilibrium quantum states.

He retired on July 1, 2005, and was a professor emeritus since that time.
