= Lake metabolism =

Balance between production and consumption of organic matter in lakes

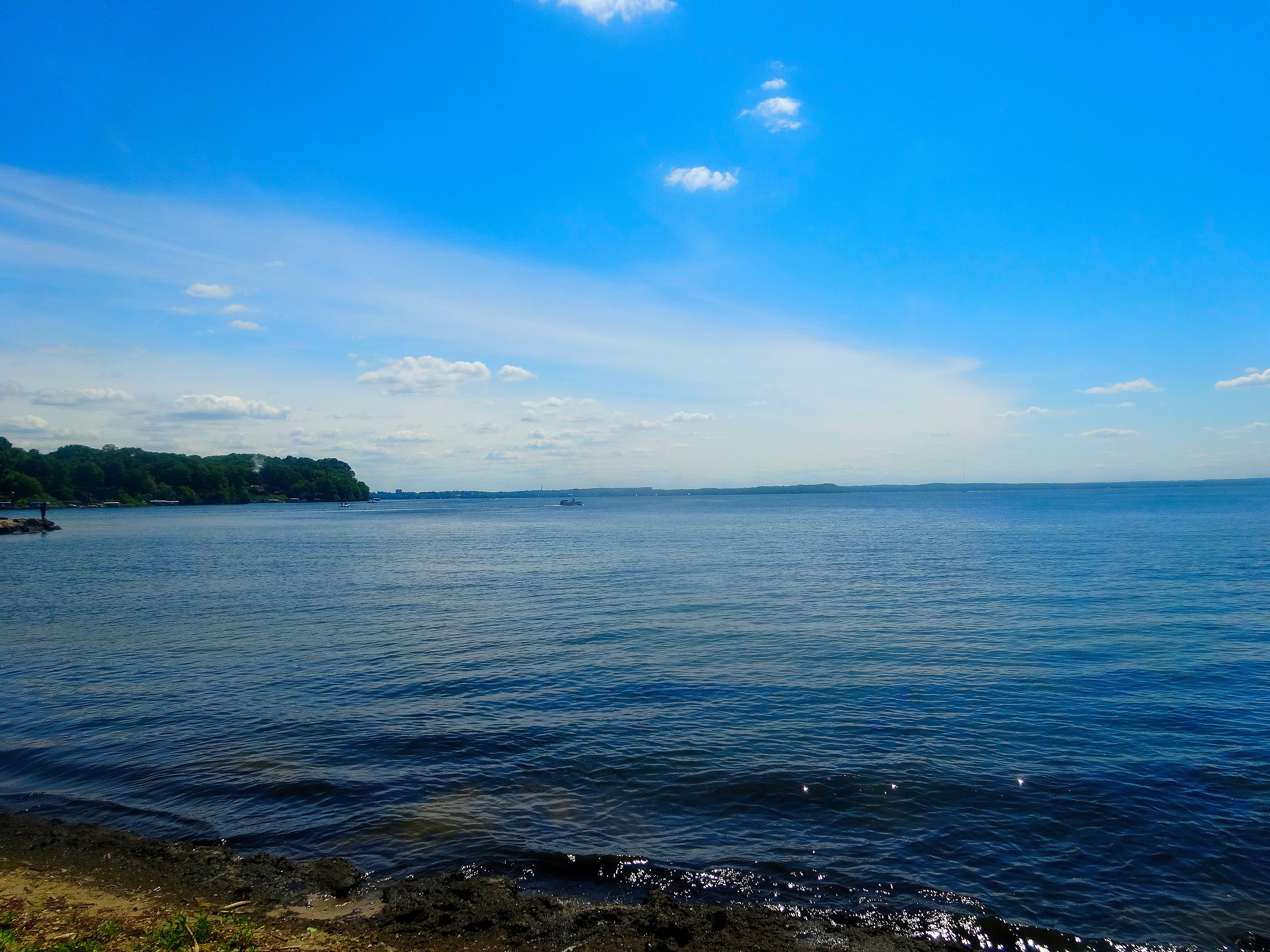
Lake Mendota in Madison, Wisconsin. One of the most well-studied lakes in the world including estimates of lake metabolism.

Lake metabolism represents a lake's balance between carbon fixation (gross primary production) and biological carbon oxidation (ecosystem respiration). Whole-lake metabolism includes the carbon fixation and oxidation from all organisms within the lake, from bacteria to fishes, and is typically estimated by measuring changes in dissolved oxygen or carbon dioxide throughout the day.

Ecosystem respiration in excess of gross primary production indicates the lake receives organic material from the surrounding catchment, such as through stream or groundwater inflows or litterfall. Lake metabolism often controls the carbon dioxide emissions from or influx to lakes, but it does not account for all carbon dioxide dynamics since inputs of inorganic carbon from the surrounding catchment also influence carbon dioxide within lakes.

== Concept ==
Estimates of lake metabolism typically rely on the measurement of dissolved oxygen or carbon dioxide, or measurements of a carbon or oxygen tracer to estimate production and consumption of organic carbon. Oxygen is produced and carbon dioxide consumed through photosynthesis and oxygen is consumed and carbon dioxide produced through respiration. Here, organic matter is symbolized by glucose, though the chemical species produced and respired through these reactions vary widely.

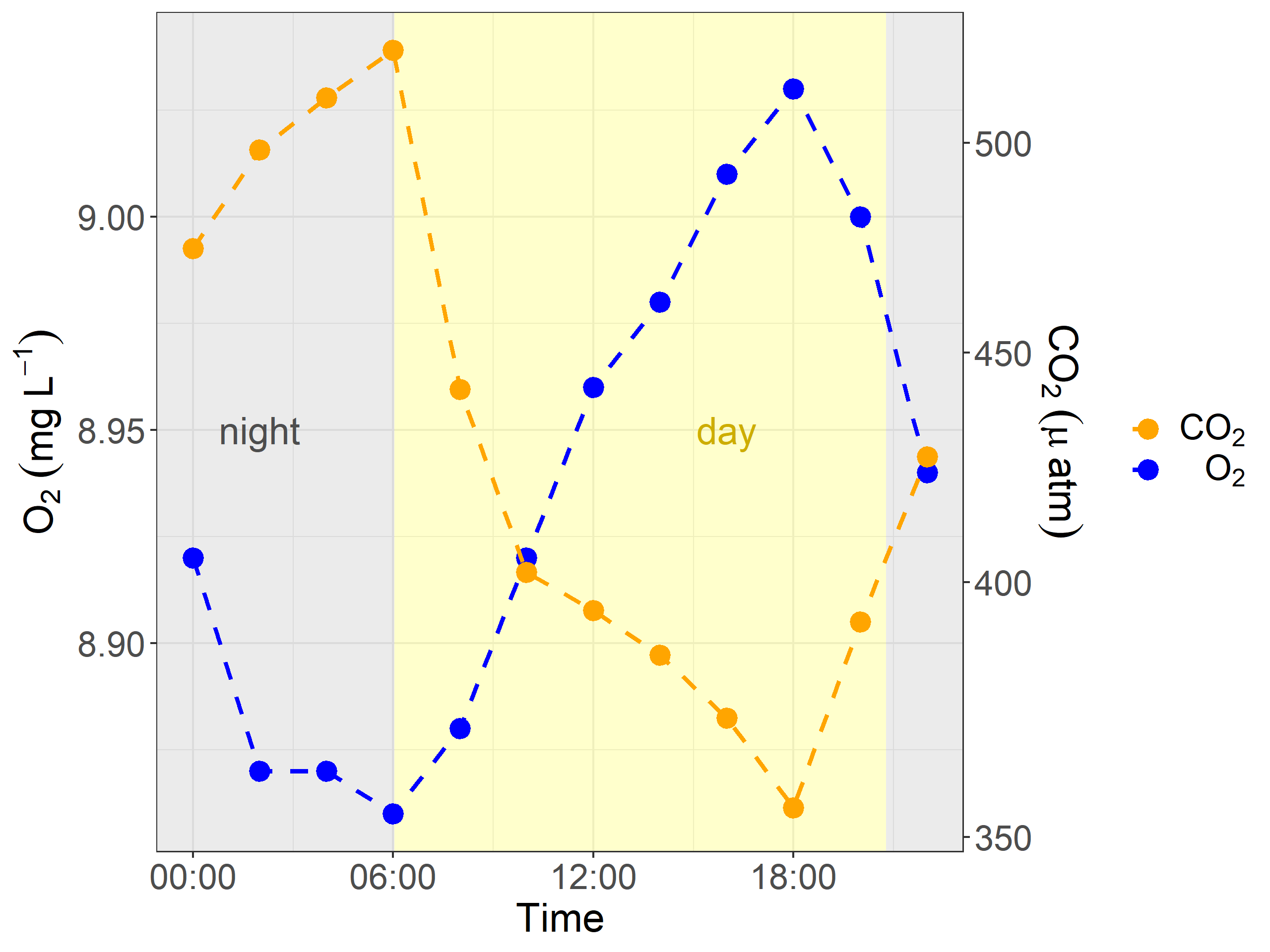
Example of O_{2} and CO_{2} cycle within a lake upper mixed layer (epilimnion). During the day, gross primary production outpaces lake respiration resulting in a net production of O_{2} and consumption of CO_{2}. Later in the day when solar radiation is reduced and during the night when there is no light, respiration still occurs in the absence of gross primary production resulting in net consumption of O_{2} and production of CO_{2}. Data for this figure are from Harp Lake on August 1, 2014.

Photosynthesis: $6CO_2+6H_2O\xrightarrow[]{light} C_6H_{12}O_6 + 6O_2$

Respiration: $C_6H_{12}O_6 + 6O_2\xrightarrow[]{} 6CO_2+6H_2O$

Photosynthesis and oxygen production only occur in the presence of light, while the consumption of oxygen via respiration occurs in both the presence and absence of light. Lake metabolism terms include:

- GPP - gross primary production (e.g. total photosynthesis)
- R - total respiration $(R_h + R_a)$
- $R_h$- heterotrophic respiration
- $R_a$- autotrophic respiration
- NEP - net ecosystem production = GPP - R
- NPP - net primary production = GPP - $R_a$

== Measurement techniques ==
Estimating lake metabolism requires approximating processes that influence the production and consumption of organic carbon by organisms within the lake. Cyclical changes on a daily scale occur in most lakes on Earth because sunlight is available for photosynthesis and production of new carbon only for a portion of the day. Researchers can take advantage of this diel pattern to measure rates of change in carbon itself or changes in dissolved gases such as carbon dioxide or oxygen that occur on a daily scale. Although daily estimates of metabolism are most common, whole-lake metabolism can be integrated over longer time periods such as seasonal or annual rates by estimating a whole-lake carbon budget. The following sections highlight the most common ways to estimate lake metabolism across a variety of temporal and spatial scales and go over some of the assumptions of each of these methods.

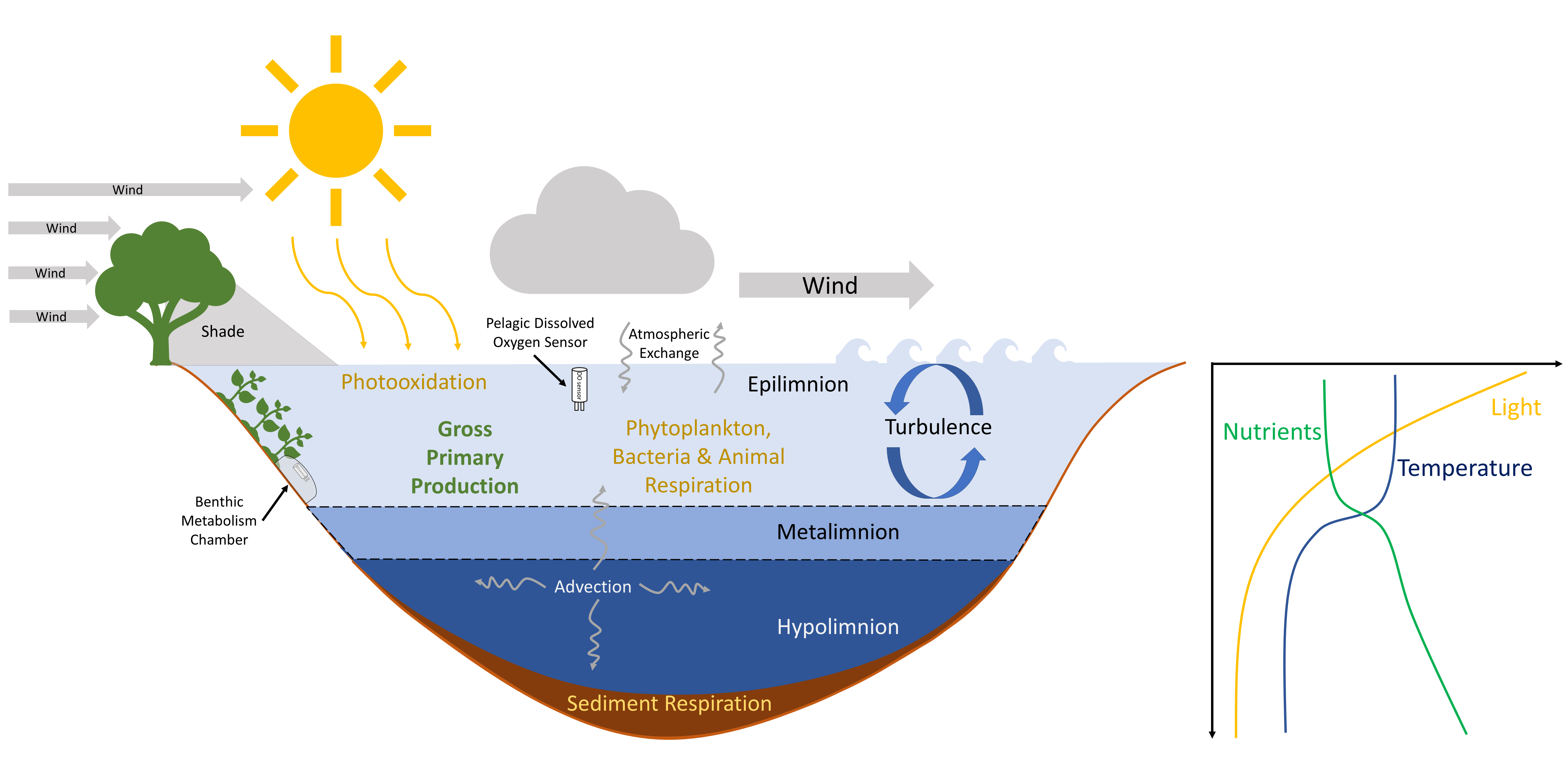
Lake cross-sectional diagram of the factors influencing lake metabolic rates and concentration of dissolved gases within lakes. Processes in gold text consume oxygen and produce carbon dioxide while processes in green text produce oxygen and consume carbon dioxide. Physical processes can both increase or decrease dissolved gas concentration, for example atmospheric gas exchange can increase or decrease lake dissolved oxygen depending on whether the lake is undersaturated or oversaturated in dissolved oxygen compared to the atmosphere, respectively. The panel on the right shows how light, temperature, and nutrients tend to change with depth for a stratified lake, which in turn results in variation in metabolic rates vertically within a lake.

=== Free-water methods ===
Measurement of diel changes in dissolved gases within the lake, also known as the "free-water" method, has quickly become the most common method of estimating lake metabolism since the wide adoption of autonomous sensors used to measure dissolved oxygen and carbon dioxide in water. The free-water method is particularly popular since many daily estimates of lake metabolism can be collected relatively cheaply and can give insights into metabolic regimes during difficult-to-observe time periods, such as during storm events. Measured changes in dissolved oxygen and carbon dioxide within a lake represents the sum of all organismal metabolism from bacteria to fishes, after accounting for abiotic changes in dissolved gases. Abiotic changes in dissolved gases include exchanges of dissolved gases between the atmosphere and lake surface, vertical or horizontal entrainment of water with differing concentrations (e.g. low-oxygen water below a lake's thermocline), or import and export of dissolved gases from inflowing streams or a lake outlet. Abiotic changes in dissolved gases can dominate changes of dissolved gases if the lake has a low metabolic rate (e.g. oligotrophic lake, cloudy day), or if there is a large event that causes abiotic factors to exceed biotic (e.g. wind event causing mixing and entrainment of low-oxygenated water). Biotic signals in dissolved gases are most evident when the sun is shining and photosynthesis is occurring, resulting in the production of dissolved oxygen and consumption of carbon dioxide. The conversion of solar energy to chemical energy is termed gross primary production (GPP) and the dissipation of this energy through biological carbon oxidation is termed ecosystem respiration (ER). High-frequency (e.g. 10 minute interval) measurements of dissolved oxygen or carbon dioxide can be translated into estimates of GPP, ER, and the difference between the two termed Net Ecosystem Production (NEP), by fitting the high-frequency data to models of lake metabolism. The governing equation for estimating lake metabolism from a single sensor located in the upper mixed layer measuring dissolved oxygen is:

DO/t = GPP-ER+F

Where F is the flux of gases between the lake and the atmosphere. Additional terms of abiotic gas flux can be added if those abiotic fluxes are deemed significant for a lake (e.g. mixing events, inflowing stream gases). Atmospheric gas exchange (F) is rarely directly measured and typically modeled by estimating lake surface turbulence from wind-driven and convective mixing. Most often, F is estimated from measurements of wind speed and atmospheric pressure, and different models for estimating F can result in significantly different estimates of lake metabolic rates depending on the study lake. Gross primary production is assumed to be zero during the night due to low or no light, and thus ER can be estimated from nighttime changes in dissolved oxygen (or carbon dioxide) after accounting for abiotic changes in dissolved oxygen. Gross primary production can be estimated assuming that ER is equal during the day and night and accounting for dissolved oxygen changes during the day, however, this assumption may not be valid in every lake.

Extracting a high signal-to-noise ratio is key to obtaining good estimates of lake metabolism from the free-water technique, and there are choices that a researcher needs to make prior to collection data and during data analyses to ensure accurate estimates. Location of dissolved gas collection (typically in the surface mixed layer), number of sensors vertically and horizontally, frequency and duration of data collection, and modeling methods need to be considered.

==== Free-water metabolism modeling techniques ====
The free-water measurement techniques require mathematical models to estimate lake metabolism metrics from high-frequency dissolved gas measurements. These models range in complexity from simple algebraic models to depth-integrated modeling using more advanced statistical techniques. Several statistical techniques have been used to estimate GPP, R, and NEP or parameters relating to these metabolism terms.

=== Light and dark bottle methods ===
The light and dark bottle method uses the same concept as the free-water method to estimate rates of metabolism - GPP only occurs during the day with solar energy while ER occurs in both the presence and absence of light. This method incubates lake water in two separate bottles, one that is clear and exposed to natural or artificial light regime and another that is sealed off from the light by wrapping the bottle in foil, paint, or another method. Changes in carbon fixation or dissolved gases are then measured over a certain time period (e.g. several hours to a day) to estimate the rate of metabolism for specific lake depths or an integrated lake water column. Carbon fixation is measured by injecting radioactive carbon isotope ^{14}C into light and dark bottles and sampling the bottles over the time - the samples are filtered onto filter paper and the amount of ^{14}C incorporated into algal (and bacterial) cells is estimated by measuring samples on a scintillation counter. The difference between the light and dark bottle ^{14}C can be considered the rate of primary productivity; however, due to non-photosynthetic uptake of CO_{2} there is debate as to whether dark bottles should be used with the ^{14}C method or if only a light bottle and a bottle treated with the algicide DCMU should be used. Rates of change in dissolved gases, either carbon dioxide or oxygen, need both the light and dark bottles to estimate rates of productivity and respiration.

=== Whole-lake carbon budget methods ===
Probably the most labor-intensive method of estimating a metric of lake metabolism is by measuring all the inputs and outputs of either organic or inorganic carbon to a lake over a season or year, also known as a whole-lake carbon budget. Measuring all the inputs and outputs of carbon to and from a lake can be used to estimate net ecosystem production (NEP). Since NEP is the difference between gross primary production and respiration (NEP = GPP - R), it can be viewed as the net biological conversion of inorganic carbon to organic carbon (and vice versa), and can thus be determined through whole-lake mass balance of either inorganic or organic carbon. NEP assessed through inorganic (IC) or organic carbon (OC) can be estimated as:

$NEP_{OC} = E_{OC} + S_{OC} - I_{OC}$

$NEP_{IC} = I_{IC} - S_{IC} - E_{IC}$

where E is export of OC through fluvial transport and IC through fluvial transport and carbon gas (e.g. CO_{2}, CH_{4}) exchange between the lake surface to the atmosphere; S is storage in the lake sediments and water column for OC and water column for IC; and I is the input of OC and IC from fluvial, surrounding wetland, and airborne pathways (e.g. atmospheric deposition, litterfall). A lake that receives more OC from the watershed than it exports downstream or accumulates in the water column and sediments (I_{oc} > E_{oc} + S_{oc}) indicates that there was net conversion of OC to IC within the lake and is thus net heterotrophic (negative NEP). Likewise, a lake that accumulates and exports more IC than was received from the watershed (S_{ic} + E_{ic} > I_{ic}) also indicates net conversion of OC to IC within the lake and is thus net heterotrophic.

=== Benthic metabolism methods ===
Although the free-water method likely contains some benthic metabolic signal, isolating the benthic contribution to whole-lake metabolism requires benthic-specific methods. Analogous to the light and dark bottle methods described above, lake sediment cores can be collected and changes in dissolved oxygen or carbon fixation can be used to estimate rates of primary productivity and respiration. Relatively new methods describe isolating the sediment-water interface with transparent domes and measure changes in dissolved oxygen in-situ, which is a hybrid between the free-water method and light-dark bottle method. These in-situ benthic chamber methods allow for relatively easy multi-day estimate of benthic metabolism, which helps the researcher determine how benthic metabolism changes with varying weather patterns and lake characteristics.

=== Assumptions ===
Extrapolating site or depth specific measurements to the entire lake can be problematic as there can be significant metabolic variability both vertically and horizontally within a lake (see variability section). For example, many lake metabolism studies only have a single epilimnetic estimate of metabolism, however, this may overestimate metabolic characteristics about the lake such as NEP depending on the mixed layer depth to light extinction depth ratio. Averaging daily metabolism estimates over longer time periods may help overcome some of these single site extrapolation issues, but one must carefully consider the implications of the metabolic estimates and not over extrapolate measurements.

== Relation to constituents ==
Organismal metabolic rate, or the rate at which organisms assimilate, transform, and expend energy, is influenced by a few key constituents, namely light, nutrients, temperature, and organic matter. The influence of these constituents on organismal metabolism ultimately governs metabolism at the whole-lake scale and can dictate whether a lake is a net source or sink of carbon. In the following section, we describe the relationship between these key constituents and organismal and ecosystem-level metabolism. Although relationships between organisms and constituents described here are well-established, interacting effects of constituents on metabolic rates from organisms to lake ecosystems makes predicting changes in metabolism across lakes or within lakes through time difficult. Many of these complex interacting effects will be discussed in the spatial and temporal variability section.

=== Temperature ===
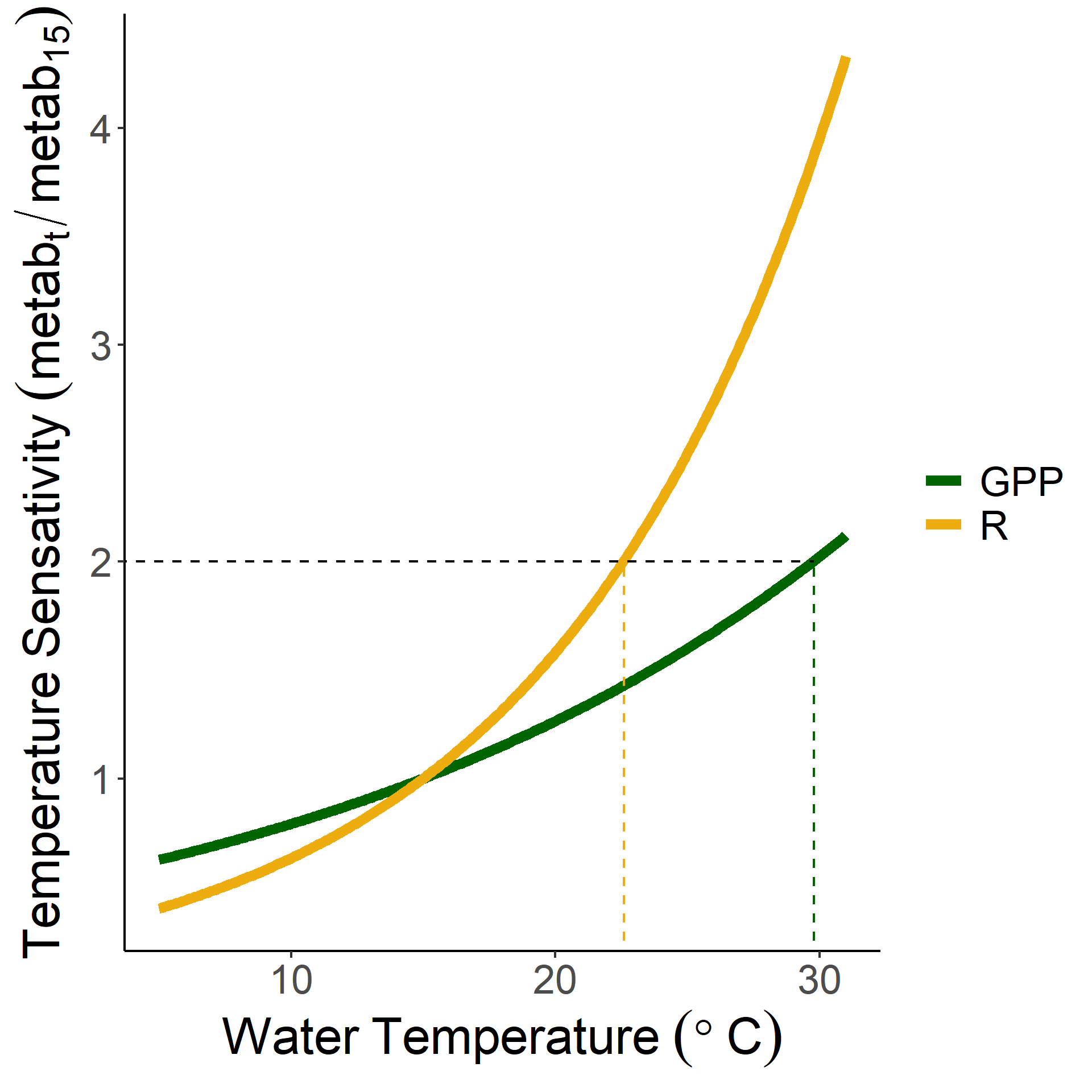
Temperature sensitivity of gross primary production (GPP) and respiration (R) based on average activation energies reported in Yvon-Durocher et al. (2012). As water temperature increases, R increases more rapidly than GPP due to the higher average activation energy for R. In this figure, GPP and R temperature responses are reported as relative to GPP and R rates at 15 °C (59 °F). A doubling of metabolic rates compared to metabolic rate at 15°C (horizontal dashed line) occurs with just a 7.6°C increase for R but requires a 14.8°C increase to double GPP.

Temperature is a strong controlling factor on biochemical reaction rates and biological activity. Optimal temperature varies across aquatic organisms as some organisms are more cold-adapted while others prefer warmer habitats. There are rare cases of extreme thermal tolerance in hypersaline antarctic lakes (e.g. Don Juan Pond) or hot springs (e.g. Fly Geyser); however, most lake organisms on Earth reside in temperatures ranging from 0 to 40 °C. Metabolic rates typically scale exponentially with temperature, however, the activation energy for primary productivity and respiration often differ, with photosynthesis having a lower activation energy than aerobic respiration. These differences in activation energies could have implications for net metabolic balance within lake ecosystems as the climate warms. For example, Scharfenberger et al. (2019) show that increasing water temperature resulting from climate change could switch lakes from being net autotrophic to heterotrophic due to differences in activation energy, however, the temperature at which they switch depends on the amount of nutrients available.

=== Nutrients ===
The amount of material available for assimilating into organismal cells controls the rate of metabolism at the cellular to lake ecosystem level. In lakes, phosphorus and nitrogen are the most common limiting nutrients of primary production and ecosystem respiration. Foundational work on the positive relationship between phosphorus concentration and lake eutrophication resulted in legislation that limited the amount of phosphorus in laundry detergents, among other regulations. Although phosphorus is often used as a predictor of lake ecosystem productivity and excess phosphorus as an indicator of eutrophication, many studies show that metabolism is co-limited by phosphorus and nitrogen or nitrogen alone. The balance between phosphorus, nitrogen, and other nutrients, termed ecological stoichiometry, can dictate rates of organismal growth and whole-lake metabolism through cellular requirements of these essential nutrients mediated by life-history traits. For example, fast-growing cladocerans have a much lower nitrogen to phosphorus ratio (N:P) than copepods, mostly due to the high amount of phosphorus-rich RNA in their cells used for rapid growth. Cladocerans residing in lakes with high N:P ratios relative to cladoceran body stoichiometry will be limited in growth and metabolism, having effects on whole-lake metabolism. Furthermore, cascading effects from food web manipulations can cause changes in productivity from changes to nutrient stoichiometry. For example, piscivore addition can reduce predation pressure on fast-growing, low N:P cladocerans which increase in population rapidly, retain phosphorus in their cells, and can cause a lake to become phosphorus limited, consequently reducing whole-lake primary productivity.

=== Light ===
Solar energy is required for converting carbon dioxide and water into organic matter, otherwise known as photosynthesis. As with temperature and nutrients, different algae have different rates of metabolic response to increasing light and also different optimal light conditions for growth, as some algae are more adapted for darker environments while others can outcompete in lighter conditions. Light can also interact with nutrients to affect species-specific algal productivity response to increasing light. These different responses at the organismal level propagate up to influence metabolism at the ecosystem level. Even in low-nutrient lakes where nutrients would be expected to be the limiting resource for primary productivity, light can still be the limiting resource, which has cascading negative effects on higher trophic levels such as fish productivity. Variability in light in different lake zones and within a lake through time creates patchiness in productivity both spatially and temporally.

In addition to controlling primary productivity, sunlight can also influence rates of respiration by partially oxidizing organic matter which can make it easier for bacteria to break down and convert into carbon dioxide. This partial photooxidation essentially increases the amount of organic matter that is available for mineralization. In some lakes, complete photooxidation or partial photooxidation can account for a majority of the conversion from organic to inorganic matter, however, the proportion to bacterial respiration varies greatly among lakes.

=== Organic carbon ===
Primary and secondary consumers in lakes require organic matter (either from plants or animals) to maintain organismal function. Organic matter including tree leaves, dissolved organic matter, and algae provide essential resources to these consumers and in the process increase lake ecosystem respiration rates in the conversion of organic matter to cellular growth and organismal maintenance. Some sources of organic matter may impact the availability of other constituents. For example, dissolved organic matter often darkens lake water which reduces the amount of light available in the lake, thus reducing primary production. However, increases in organic matter loading to a lake can also increase nutrients that are associated with the organic matter, which can stimulate primary production and respiration. Increased dissolved organic matter loading can create tradeoffs between increasing light limitation and release from nutrient limitation. This tradeoff can create non-linear relationships between lake primary production and dissolved organic matter loading based on how much nutrients are associated with the organic matter and how quickly the dissolved organic matter blocks out light in the water column. This is because at low dissolved organic matter concentrations as dissolved organic matter concentration increases, increased associated nutrients enhances GPP. But as dissolved organic matter continues to increase, the reduction in light from the darkening of the lake water suppresses GPP as light becomes the limiting resource for primary productivity. Differences in the magnitude and location of maximum GPP in response to increased DOC load are hypothesized to arise based on the ratio of DOC to nutrients coming into the lake as well as the effect of DOC on lake light climate. The darkening of the lake water can also change thermal regimes within the lake as darker waters typically mean that warmer waters remain at the top of the lake while cooler waters are at the bottom. This change in heat energy distribution can impact the rates of pelagic and benthic productivity (see Temperature above), and change water column stability, with impacts on vertical distribution of nutrients, therefore having effects on vertical distribution of metabolic rates.

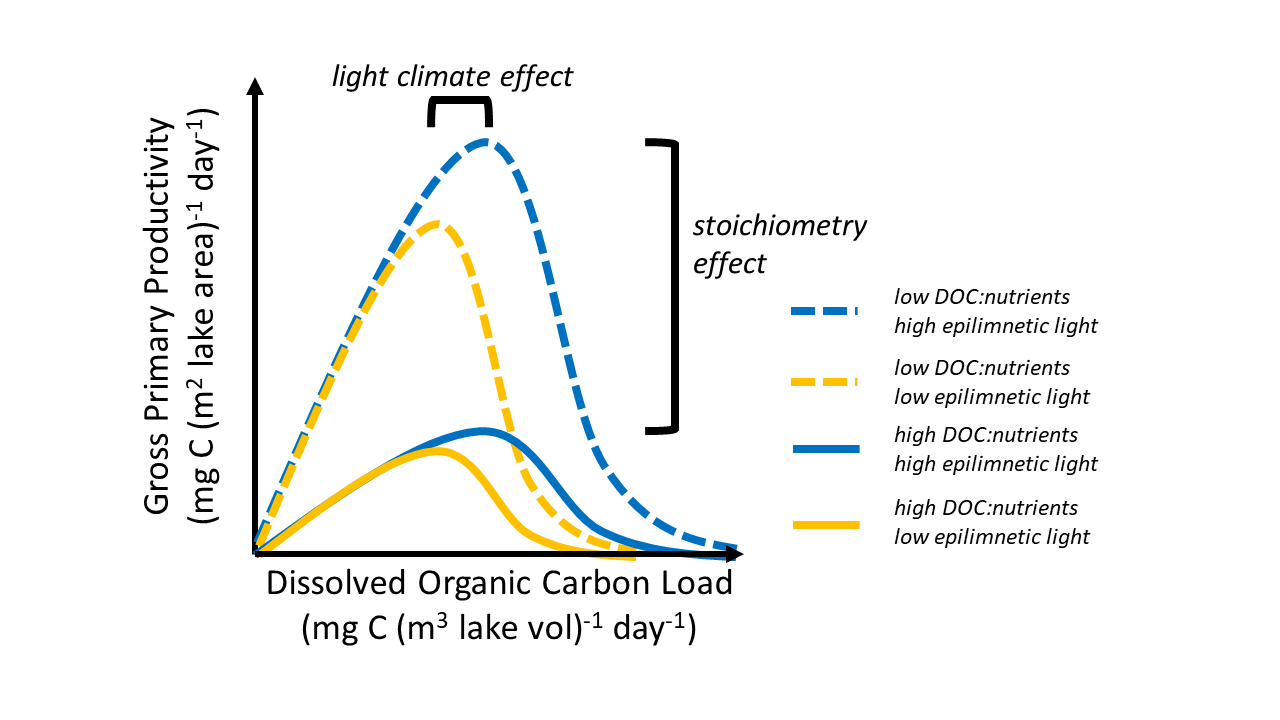
Conceptualized indirect effects of dissolved organic carbon (DOC) on gross primary productivity through interacting effects of DOC impacts on light and nutrient availability in lakes. Figure is redrawn from Kelly et al. 2018

=== Other constituents ===
Other lake constituents can influence lake metabolic rates including CO_{2} concentration, pH, salinity, and silica, among others. CO_{2} can be a limiting (or co-limiting along with other nutrients) resource for primary productivity and can promote more intense phytoplankton blooms. Some algal species, such as chrysophytes, may not have carbon-concentrating mechanisms or the ability to use bicarbonate as a source of inorganic carbon for photosynthesis, thus, elevated levels of CO_{2} may increase their rates of photosynthesis. During algal blooms, elevated dissolved CO_{2} ensures that CO_{2} is not a limiting resource for growth since rapid increases in production deplete CO_{2} and raise pH. Changes in pH at short time scales (e.g. sub-daily) from spikes in primary productivity may cause short-term reductions in bacterial growth and respiration, but at longer timescales, bacterial communities can adapt to elevated pH.

Salinity can also cause changes in metabolic rates of lakes through salinity impacts on individual metabolic rates and community composition. Lake metabolic rates can be correlated both positively or negatively with salinity due to interactions of salinity with other drivers of ecosystem metabolism, such as flushing rates or droughts. For example, Moreira-Turcq (2000) found that excess precipitation over evaporation caused reduced salinity in a coastal lagoon, increased nutrient loading, and increased pelagic primary productivity. The positive relationship between primary productivity and salinity might be an indicator of changes in nutrient availability due to increased inflows. However, salinity increases from road salts can cause toxicity in some lake organisms, and extreme cases of salinity increases can restrict lake mixing which could change distribution of metabolism rates throughout the lake water column.

== Spatial and temporal variability ==
Metabolic rates in lakes and reservoirs are controlled by many environmental factors, such as light and nutrient availability, temperature, and water column mixing regimes. Thus, spatial and temporal changes in those factors cause spatial and temporal variability in metabolic rates, and each of those factors affect metabolism at different spatial and temporal scales.

=== Spatial variation within lakes ===
Variable contributions from different lake zones (i.e. littoral, limnetic, benthic) to whole lake metabolism depends mostly on patchiness in algal and bacterial biomass, and light and nutrient availability. In terms of the organisms contributing to metabolism in each of these zones, limnetic metabolism is dominated by phytoplankton, zooplankton, and bacterial metabolism, with low contribution from epiphytes and fish. Benthic metabolism can receive great contributions from macrophytes, macro- and microalgae, invertebrates, and bacteria. Benthic metabolism is usually highest in shallow littoral zones, or in clear-water shallow lakes, in which light reaches the bottom of the lake to stimulate primary production. In dark or turbid deep lakes, primary production may be restricted to shallower waters and aerobic respiration may be reduced or non-existent in deeper waters due to the formation of anoxic deep zones.

The degree of spatial heterogeneity in metabolic rates within a lake depends on lake morphometry, catchment characteristics (e.g. differences in land use throughout the catchment and inputs from streams), and hydrodynamic processes. For example, lakes with more intense hydrodynamic processes, such as strong vertical and lateral mixing, are more laterally and vertically homogeneous in relation to metabolic rates than highly stratified lakes. On the other hand, lakes with more developed littoral areas have greater metabolic heterogeneity laterally than lakes with a more circular shape and low proportions of shallow littoral areas.

Light attenuation occurring throughout the water column, in combination with thermal and chemical stratification and wind- or convective-driven turbulence, contribute to the vertical distribution of nutrients and organisms in the water column. In stratified lakes, organic matter and nutrients tend to be more concentrated at deeper layers, while light is more available at shallower layers. The vertical distribution of primary production responds to a balance between light and nutrient availability, while respiration occurs more independently of light and nutrients and more homogeneously with depth. This often results in strong coupling of gross primary production (GPP) and ecosystem respiration (ER) in lake surface layers but weaker coupling at greater depths. This means that ER rates are strongly dependent on primary production in shallower layers, while in deeper layers it becomes more dependent on a mixture of organic matter from terrestrial sources and sedimentation of algae particles and organic matter produced in shallower layers. In lakes with a low concentration of nutrients in surface waters and with light penetration below the mixed layer, primary production is higher in intermediate depths, where there is sufficient light for photosynthesis and higher nutrient availability. On the other hand, low transparent polymictic lakes have higher primary production on near-surface layers, usually with a net autotrophic balance (GPP > ER) between primary production and respiration.

Laterally, heterogeneity within lakes is driven by differences in metabolic rates in the open water limnetic zones and the more benthic-dominated littoral zones. Littoral areas are usually more complex and heterogeneous, in part because of their proximity with the terrestrial system, but also due to low water volume and high sediment-to-water volume ratio. Thus, littoral zones are more susceptible to changes in temperature, inputs of nutrients and organic matter from the landscape and river inflows, wind shear mixing and wave action, shading from terrestrial vegetation, and resuspension of the sediments (Figure 1). Additionally, littoral zones usually have greater habitat complexity due to the presence of macrophytes, which serve as shelter, nursery, and feeding place for many organisms. Consequently, metabolic rates in the littoral areas usually have high short-term variability and are typically greater than limnetic metabolic rates.

=== Spatial variation across lakes ===
In addition to spatial variability within lakes, whole-lake metabolic rates and their drivers also differ across lakes. Each lake has a unique set of characteristics depending on their morphometry, catchment properties, and hydrologic characteristics. These features affect lake conditions, such as water colour, temperature, nutrients, organic matter, light attenuation, vertical and horizontal mixing, with direct and indirect effects on lake metabolism.

As lakes differ in the status of their constituents (e.g. light, nutrients, temperature, and organic matter), there are emerging differences in the magnitude and variability of metabolic rates among lakes. In the previous section (Relation to Constituents), we discussed the expected patterns of metabolic rates in response to variability in these influential constituents. Here, we will discuss how whole-lake metabolism varies across lakes due to differences in these constituents as mediated by differences in lake morphometry, catchment properties, and water residence time.

Lake morphometry (e.g. lake size and shape) and catchment properties (e.g. land use, drainage area, climate, and geological characteristics) determine the flux of external inputs of organic matter and nutrients per unit of lake water volume. As the ratio between catchment size and lake water volume (drainage ratio) increases, the flux of nutrients and organic matter from the surrounding terrestrial landscape generally increases. That is, small lakes with relatively large catchments will receive more external inputs of nutrients and organic matter per unit of lake volume than large lakes with relatively small catchments, thus enhancing both primary production and respiration rates. In lakes with small drainage ratio (i.e. relative large lake surface area in relation to catchment area), metabolic processes are expected to be less dependent on external inputs coming from the surrounding catchment. Additionally, small lakes are less exposed to wind-driven mixing and typically have higher terrestrial organic matter input which often results in shallower mixing depths and enhanced light attenuation, thus limiting primary production to upper portions of small lakes. Considering lakes with similar catchment properties, small lakes are generally more net heterotrophic (GPP < ER) than large lakes, since their higher respiration rates are fueled by higher allochthonous organic matter (i.e. synthesized within the drainage area, but outside of the water body) entering the system and outpaces primary production which is limited to shallower lake layers.

Conceptual diagrams of the theoretical effects of different land use [(A) Agricultural dominated landscape; and (B) forested landscape] on lake gross primary production (GPP), ecosystem respiration (ER), and net ecosystem production (NEP).

Catchment properties, namely land cover, land use, and geologic characteristics, influence lake metabolism through their impact on the quality of organic matter and nutrients entering the lake as well as wind exposure. The organic matter quality can impact light attenuation, and along with wind exposure, can influence heat and light distribution throughout the water lake column. Lakes in landscapes dominated by agriculture have higher nutrient inputs and lower organic matter inputs compared to lakes with similar drainage ratio but in landscapes dominated by forests. Thus, lakes in agricultural-dominated landscapes are expected to have higher primary production rates, more algal blooms, and excessive macrophyte biomass compared to lakes in forest-dominated landscapes (Figure). However, the effects of catchment size and catchment type are complex and interactive. Relatively small forested lakes are more shaded and protected from wind exposure and also receive high amounts of allochthonous organic matter. Thus, small forested lakes are generally more humic with a shallow mixed layer and reduced light penetration. The high inputs of allochthonous organic matter (produced outside the lake) stimulate heterotrophic communities, such as bacteria, zooplankton, and fish, enhancing whole-lake respiration rates. Hence small forested lakes are more likely to be net heterotrophic, with ER rates exceeding primary production rates in the lake. On the other hand, forested lakes with low drainage ratio receive relatively less nutrients and organic matter, typically resulting in clear-water lakes, with low GPP and ER rates (Table).

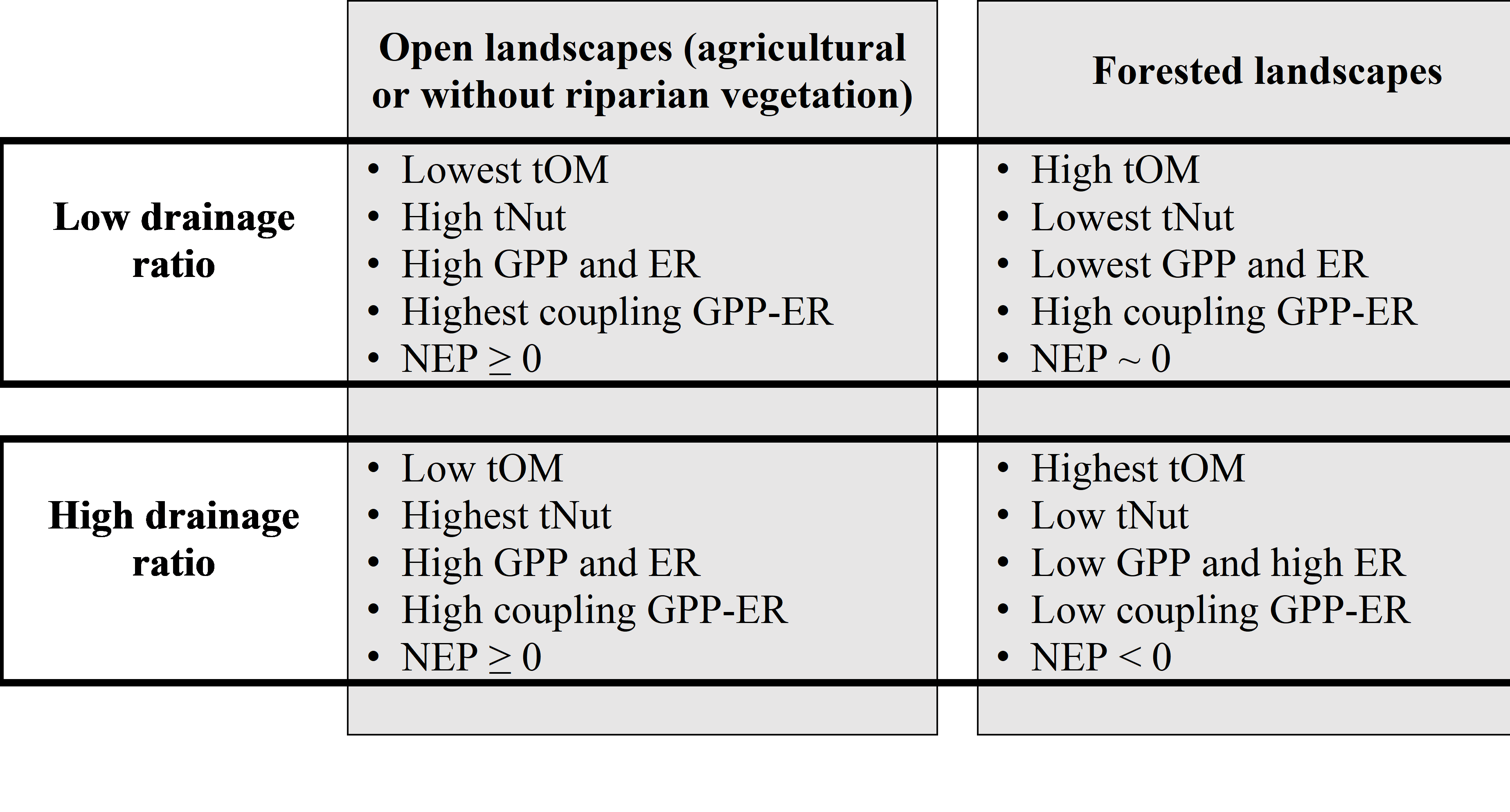
Typical interacting effects of drainage ratio (catchment size to lake water volume) and catchment land cover on terrestrial organic matter availability (tOM), nutrient availability (tNut), and lake metabolism including gross primary production (GPP), ecosystem respiration (ER), and net ecosystem productivity (NEP).

Another important difference among lakes that influences lake metabolism variability is the residence time of the water in the system, especially among lakes that are intensively managed by humans. Changes to lake level and flushing rates affects nutrient and organic matter concentrations, organism abundance, and rates of ecological processes such as photodegradation of colored organic matter, thus affecting metabolic rates magnitudes and variability. Endorheic lakes or lakes with intermediate hydraulic residence time (HRT) typically have a high retention time of nutrients and organic matter in the system, that favours growth of primary producers and bacterial degradation of organic matter. Thus, these types of lakes are expected to maintain relatively higher and less variable GPP and ER rates, than lakes with low residence time in the same trophic status. On the other hand, lakes with long HRT are expected to have reduced metabolic rates due to lower inputs of nutrients and organic matter to the lake. Finally, lentic systems that have frequent and intense changes in water level and accelerated flushing rates have a dynamic closer to lotic systems, with usually low GPP and ER rates, due to nutrients, organic matter, and algae being flushed out of the system during intense flushing events.

=== Temporal variation on a daily scale ===
On a daily scale, GPP rates are most affected by the diel cycle of photosynthetically active radiation while ER is largely affected by changes in water temperature. Additionally, ER rates are also tied to the quantity or quality of the organic substrate and relative contributions of autotrophic and heterotrophic respiration, as indicated by studies of the patterns of night-time respiration (e.g. Sadro et al. 2014). For example, bacterioplankton respiration can be higher during the day and in the first hours of the night, due to the higher availability of labile dissolved organic matter produced by phytoplankton. As the sun rises, there is a rapid increase in primary production in the lake, often making it autotrophic (NEP > 0) and reducing dissolved CO_{2} that was produced from carbon mineralization that occurred during the night. This behavior continues until reaching a peak in NEP, typically around the maximum light availability. Then there is a tendency for the NEP to fall steadily between the hours of maximum light availability until the next day's sunrise.

Conceptual figures showing (A) diel variations in lake ecosystem respiration (ER), gross primary production (GPP) and net ecosystem productivity (NEP), (B) differences in GPP daily rates due to cloud cover, and (C) effects of variations in weather conditions on mixed layer depth (Z_{mix}), nutrient ([Nut]) and organic matter ([OM]) availability, and consequently daily metabolic rates.

Day-to-day differences in incoming light and temperature, due to differences in the weather, such as cloud cover and storms, affect rates of primary production and, to a lesser extent, respiration. These weather variations also cause short-term variability in mixed layer depth, which in turn affects nutrients, organic matter, and light availability, as well as vertical and horizontal gas exchanges. Deep mixing reduces light availability but also increases nutrients and organic matter availability in the upper layers. Thus the effects of short-term variability in mixed layer depth on gross primary production (GPP) will depend on which are the limiting factors on each lake at a given period. Thus a deeper mixing layer could either increase or decrease GPP rates depending on the balance between nutrient and light limitation of photosynthesis (Figure).

Responses in metabolic rates are as dynamic as the physical and chemical processes occurring in the lake, but changes in algal biomass are less variable, involving growth and loss over longer periods. High light and nutrients availability are associated with the formation of algal blooms in lakes; during these blooms GPP rates are very high, and ER rates usually increase almost as much as GPP rates, and the balance of GPP and ER is close to 1. Right after the bloom, GPP rates start to decrease but ER rates continue higher due to the high availability of labile organic matter, which can lead to a fast depletion of dissolved oxygen concentration in the water column, resulting in fish kills.

=== Temporal variation on an annual scale ===
Seasonal variations in metabolism can be driven by seasonal variations in temperature, ice-cover, rainfall, mixing and stratification dynamics, and community succession (e.g. phytoplankton control by zooplankton). Seasonal variations in lake metabolism will depend on how seasons alter the inputs of nutrients and organic matter, and light availability, and on which factors are limiting metabolic rates in each lake.

Light is a primary driver of lake metabolism, thus seasonality in light levels is an important driver of seasonal changes in lake metabolic rates. Therefore, it is expected GPP rates to be more pronounced during seasons such as spring and summer, in which light levels are higher and days are longer. This is especially pronounced for lakes with light-limited GPP, for example, more turbid or stained lakes. Seasonality in light levels also affects ER rates. Ecosystem respiration rates are usually coupled with GPP rates, thus seasons with higher GPP will also show higher ER rates associated with increased organic matter produced within the lake. Moreover, during seasons with higher light levels photodegradation of organic matter is more pronounced, which stimulates microbial degradation, enhancing heterotrophic respiration rates.

Conceptual figures of seasonal variations on gross primary production (GPP), ecosystem respiration (ER), and light in a typical (A) temperate lake and(B) tropical lake, considering only the effects of seasonal variations in temperature and light on lake metabolic rates.

Most of the lakes in the world freeze during the winter, a low-irradiance period, in which ice and snow cover limit light penetration in the water column. Light limitation occurs mainly by snow cover and not by ice, which makes primary production strongly sensitive to snow cover in those lakes. In addition to light limitation, low temperatures under ice also diminish metabolic rates, but not enough to cease metabolic processes. Therefore, the metabolic balance is usually negative during the majority of the ice season, leading to dissolved oxygen depletion. Shallow lakes in arid climates have none or very little snow cover during the winter, thus, primary production sustained under-ice can be enough to prevent dissolved oxygen depletion, as reported by Song and others in a Mongolian lake. Despite the high proportion of the world's lakes that freeze during the winter, few studies have been conducted on lake metabolism under-ice, mostly due to sampling technical difficulties. Lakes that are closer to the equator experience less seasonality regarding light intensity and daylight hours than lakes at higher latitudes (temperate and polar zones). Thus, lakes at higher latitudes are more likely to experience light limitation of primary production during low-light seasons (winter and autumn). Seasonal differences in temperature are also not so important in the tropics as they are for higher latitudes lakes. Thus, the direct effect of temperature seasonal variations on metabolic rates is more important in higher latitudes lakes than in tropical lakes (Figure). In turn, tropical and subtropical lakes are more likely to have seasonal variations following the stratification and mixing dynamics, and rainfall regimes (wet and dry seasons), than due to the four astronomical or meteorological seasons (spring, summer, autumn, and winter) when compared to higher latitudes lakes.

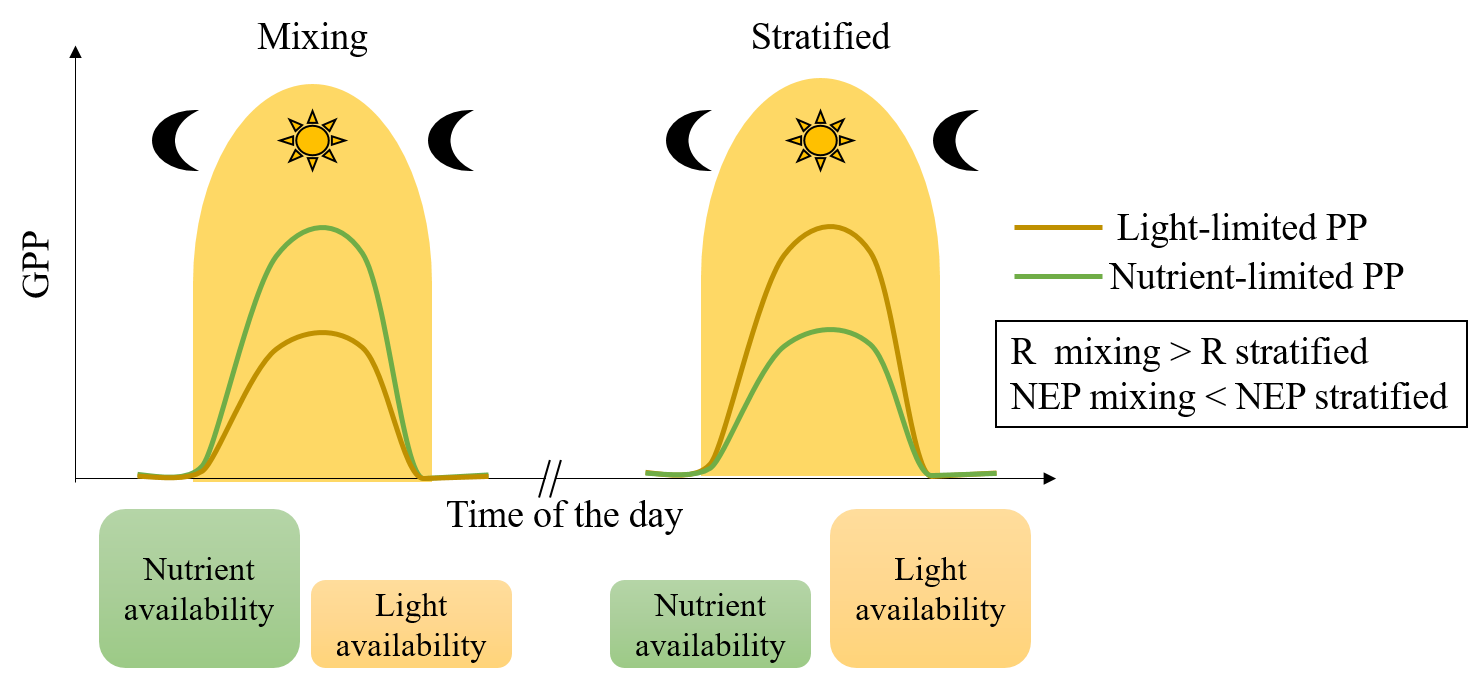
Conceptual figure of the effects of mixing and stratification dynamics on gross primary production (GPP) in two different situations: one with light-limited primary production (PP) and other with nutrient-limited PP.

Seasonal changes in temperature and rainfall lead to seasonal changes in water column stability. During periods of low water column stability, a deeper mixed layer (total or partial mixing of the water column, depending on the lake) increases the inputs of nutrients and organic matter from deeper layers and through sediment resuspension, which reduce light availability. Conversely, during periods of strong water column stability, internal loadings of nutrients, organic matter, and the associated bacteria to the water column are suppressed, while algal loss due to sinking is enhanced. Moreover, light availability during this period is higher, due to photobleaching, lower resuspension of sediments, and lower mixing depth, which expose phytoplankton to a more light-rich environment. Higher ER rates during low water column stability period, as a consequence of higher organic matter availability and higher bacteria biomass associated with this organic matter, have been reported for many lakes around the world. However, primary production rates responses to these seasonal changes have been shown different behaviors in different lakes. As said before, the responses of metabolic rates to those changes will depend on limiting factors of primary production in each lake (Figure). During low water column stability periods, upwelling of waters rich in nutrients can result in higher pelagic GPP rates, as has been observed in some tropical lakes. Conversely, during low water column stability periods, GPP rates can be limited by low light availability, as have been observed in some temperate and subtropical lakes. The net metabolic balance is usually more negative during de-stratified periods, even in lakes in which the well-mixed season is the most productive period. Regardless of the high GPP in these systems, ER rates are also enhanced by the increased availability of organic matter stocks from sediments and deeper waters.

Seasonal variations in gross primary productivity (GPP), respiration (R) and net ecossytem productivity (NEP) in a Brazilian tropical mesotrophic lake and in a Danish temperate eutrophic lake. Data for the temperate lake was digitized from Figure 7 in Staehr & Sand-Jensen (2007) and data for the tropical lake is the monthly average of metabolic rates in Brighenti et al. (2015).

Seasonal differences in rainfall also affect metabolic rates. The increase in precipitation promotes the entry of organic matter and nutrients in lakes, which can stimulate ER rates and stimulate or inhibit GPP rates, depending on the balance between increased nutrients and lower light availability. On the other hand, lower precipitation also affects limnological conditions by reducing the water level and, thereby, increasing the concentration of nutrients and chlorophyll, as well as changing the thermal stability of aquatic environments. These changes could also enhance ER and GPP rates. Thus, the degree of the responses of metabolic rates to seasonal changes in rainfall will depend on lake morphometry, catchment properties and the intensity and duration of the rainfall events. Lakes frequently exposed to strong storms, such as the typhoon areas in the Northwest Pacific Ocean, receive intense rainfall events that can last for a few days. During these storm seasons, a reduction in metabolic rates is expected due to reduced sunlight and flushing of water and organisms. This reduction is expected to be more pronounced in GPP than in ER rates, resulting in a more heterotrophic NEP (GPP < ER). In a subtropical lake in Taiwan, for example, a decoupling of GPP and ER rates was observed during typhoon seasons, following a shift in the organic matter pool from autochthonous-based (organic matter produced within the lake) to allochthonous-based (organic matter produced outside the lake). This suggests that ER rates were more resistant to the typhoon disturbance than GPP rates.

=== Interannual variations ===
Interannual variability on metabolic rates can be driven by extensive changes in the catchment or by directional and cyclical climate change and climate disturbances, such as the events associated with the El Niño Southern Oscillation (ENSO). Those changes in the catchment, air temperature, and precipitation between years affect metabolic rates by altering nutrient and organic matter inputs to the lake, light attenuation, mixing dynamics, and by direct temperature-dependence of metabolic processes.

The increase in precipitation increases external loading of organic matter, nutrients and sediments in lakes. Moreover, increased discharge events promoted by increased rainfall can also alter mixing dynamics and cause physical flushing of organisms. While lower precipitation associated with high evaporation rates also affects limnological conditions by reducing the water level and thereby increasing the concentration of nutrients and chlorophyll, as well as changing the thermal stability of aquatic environments. During warmer years, a stronger water column stability limits the inputs of nutrients and organic matter to the photic zone. In contrast, during colder years, a less stable water column enhances resuspension of the sediments and the inputs of nutrients and organic matter from deeper waters. This lowers light availability, while enhances nutrient and organic matter availability. Thus, the effects of differences in precipitation and temperature between years in metabolic rates will depend on the intensity and duration of these changes, and also in which factors are limiting GPP and ER in each water body.

In lakes with nutrients and organic matter limitation of GPP and ER, wetter years can enhance GPP and ER rates, due to higher inputs of nutrients and organic matter from the landscape. This will depend if the terrestrial inputs will be promptly available for the primary producers and heterotrophic communities or if it is going to enter the lake through deeper waters, in which metabolic processes are very low or non-existent. In this case, the inputs will only be available in the next water column mixing event. Thus, increases in metabolic rates due to rainfall depend also on the stratification and mixing dynamics, hydrology, and morphometry of the lake. On the other hand, drier years can also have enhanced GPP and ER rates if it is accompanied by lower water levels, which would lead to higher nutrients and organic matter concentrations. A lower water level is associated with a less stable water column and higher proximity with the sediments, thus increased inputs of nutrients and organic matter from deeper waters. Also, a reduction in water level through water evaporation leads to a concentration effect. In turn, during warmer years the water column is more stable, and the depth of the mixing layer is shallower, thus reducing internal inputs of nutrients and organic matter to the mixed layer. Metabolic rates, in this scenario, will be lower in the upper mixed layer. In lakes with a photic zone extending deeper than the mixed layer, metabolic rates will be higher in intermediated depths, coinciding with the deep chlorophyll maxima.

In lakes with primary production limited mostly by light availability, increases in rainfall could lead to lower light availability, associated with increased dissolved organic matter and total suspended matter. Consequently, increased rainfall would be associated with lower levels of GPP, which would reduce respiration rates associated with autochthonous production, leading to a decoupling of GPP and ER rates. In addition, increased allochthonous organic matter availability during wet years can lead to higher ER, and consequently leading the metabolic balance to be negative (NEP <0).

Changes in annual precipitation can also affect the spatial variability in metabolic rates within lakes. Williamson and collaborators, for example, found that, in a hyper-eutrophic reservoir in North America, the relative spatial variability in GPP and ER rates were higher in a dry year compared to a wet one. These suggest higher relevance of internal processes, such as internal loading, nutrient uptake, sedimentation, and resuspension, to metabolic rates during dry years.

== See also ==
- Stream metabolism
- Ecosystem model
- Catabolism
- Apparent oxygen utilisation
