= Susan Kilham =

American aquatic ecologist (1943–2022)

Susan S. Kilham
- Born: 1943
- Died: 2022 (aged 78–79); Haddonfield, New Jersey
- Education: Eckerd College; Duke University
- Awards: Phycological Society of America Career Achievement Award
- Scientific career
- Fields: Aquatic ecology; Phycology; Ecological stoichiometry
- Workplaces: Woods Hole Oceanographic Institution; University of Michigan; Drexel University

Susan Soltau Kilham (1943–2022) was an American aquatic ecologist. She made notable contributions to phycology and to ecological stoichiometry, and much of her research focused on diatoms. Kilham has also been described as a particularly prolific and impactful scientific mentor. She served on the faculty of the University of Michigan from the early 1970s until the early 1990s, and then moved to Drexel University, where she was a professor in the Department of Biodiversity, Earth and Environmental Science, as well as chairing that department and serving on the faculty senate. Kilham received the Phycological Society of America Career Achievement Award, and is the namesake of a professorship at the University of Michigan.

== Academic positions ==
Kilham was born in 1943. She attended Eckerd College (then the Florida Presbyterian College), graduating with a Bachelor of Science degree in biology in 1965. As an undergraduate at Eckerd she worked as a research assistant to George K. Reid, who had been a founding faculty member of the college.

Kilham graduated from Eckerd in 1965, and then attended Duke University, where she earned a PhD in marine science in 1971. Early in her career, Kilham's main research focus was deep-sea clams. Her PhD dissertation was entitled Deep sea bivalve molluscs: shell morphology, mineralogy and geochemistry.

After finishing her doctorate, Kilham worked as a postdoctoral fellow at the Woods Hole Oceanographic Institution, and in 1973 joined the faculty at the University of Michigan. In 1991 she moved to Drexel University where she became a professor in the Department of Biodiversity, Earth and Environmental Science, and she was affiliated with Drexel until she died in 2022. She was at one point the Chair of the Department of Biodiversity, Earth and Environmental Science, and she also served on the faculty senate.

== Research and contributions ==
Kilham was noted for contributions to ecological stoichiometry, and the ecological stoichiometry newsletter Ratios Matter credited her specifically with "bringing resource ratio theory to the forefront of community ecology." Kilham has been credited with an important idea to test certain ecological theories using algae, which made it possible to evaluate claims that could not feasibly be tested using the land organisms that were more usually used as test organisms in ecology.

A report by the Regents of the University of Michigan described Kilham's most important contributions as including "the calcification of deep-sea clams, biological processes in African lakes, the importance of resource ratios in the growth and competition of algae in freshwater lakes, and the effects of climate change on diatoms in Yellowstone Lake." They also credited her research with prompting a United States Environmental Protection Agency policy regarding the control of endocrine disruptors.

Kilham collaborated with her husband, Peter Kilham, until his death in 1989. The two had married in 1967, and Peter Kilham was also a professor at the University of Michigan, and studied related topics including diatoms.

Kilham has been noted as a particularly prolific scientific mentor, especially of women in ecology: she served on more than 80 PhD dissertation committees, at least 45 masters thesis committees, and also supervised dozens of undergraduates.

== Awards and legacy ==
In 2017, Kilham received the Phycological Society of America's Award of Excellence, which is a career achievement award. She had given the plenary lecture at the organization's annual meeting in 2015.

As of 2022, Kilham was the namesake of a scholarship at her alma mater, Eckerd College, called the Kilham Annual Scholarship for Natural Sciences.

In June 2022, the C. A. Patrides Professorship at the University of Michigan College of Literature, Science, and the Arts was renamed to the Susan S. Kilham Collegiate Professorship in Ecology and Evolutionary Biology.
