= Productivity (ecology) =

Rate of generation of biomass in an ecosystem

In ecology, productivity is the rate of generation of biomass in an ecosystem, usually expressed in units of mass per volume (unit surface) per unit of time, such as grams per square metre per day (g m^{−2} d^{−1}). The unit of mass can relate to dry matter or to the mass of generated carbon. The productivity of autotrophs, such as plants, is called primary productivity, while the productivity of heterotrophs, such as animals, is called secondary productivity.

The productivity of an ecosystem is influenced by a wide range of factors, including nutrient availability, temperature, and water availability. Understanding ecological productivity is vital because it provides insights into how ecosystems function and the extent to which they can support life.

== Primary production ==
Primary production is the synthesis of organic material from inorganic molecules. Primary production in most ecosystems is dominated by the process of photosynthesis, In which organisms synthesize organic molecules from sunlight, H_{2}O, and CO_{2}. Aquatic primary productivity refers to the production of organic matter, such as phytoplankton, aquatic plants, and algae, in aquatic ecosystems, which include oceans, lakes, and rivers. Terrestrial primary productivity refers to the organic matter production that takes place in terrestrial ecosystems such as forests, grasslands, and wetlands.

Primary production is divided into Net Primary Production (NPP) and Gross Primary Production (GPP). Gross primary production measures all carbon assimilated into organic molecules by primary producers. Net primary production measures the organic molecules by primary producers. Net primary production also measures the amount of carbon assimilated into organic molecules by primary producers, but does not include organic molecules that are then broken down again by these organism for biological processes such as cellular respiration. The formula used to calculate NPP is net primary production = gross primary production - respiration.

=== Primary producers ===
==== Photoautotrophs ====
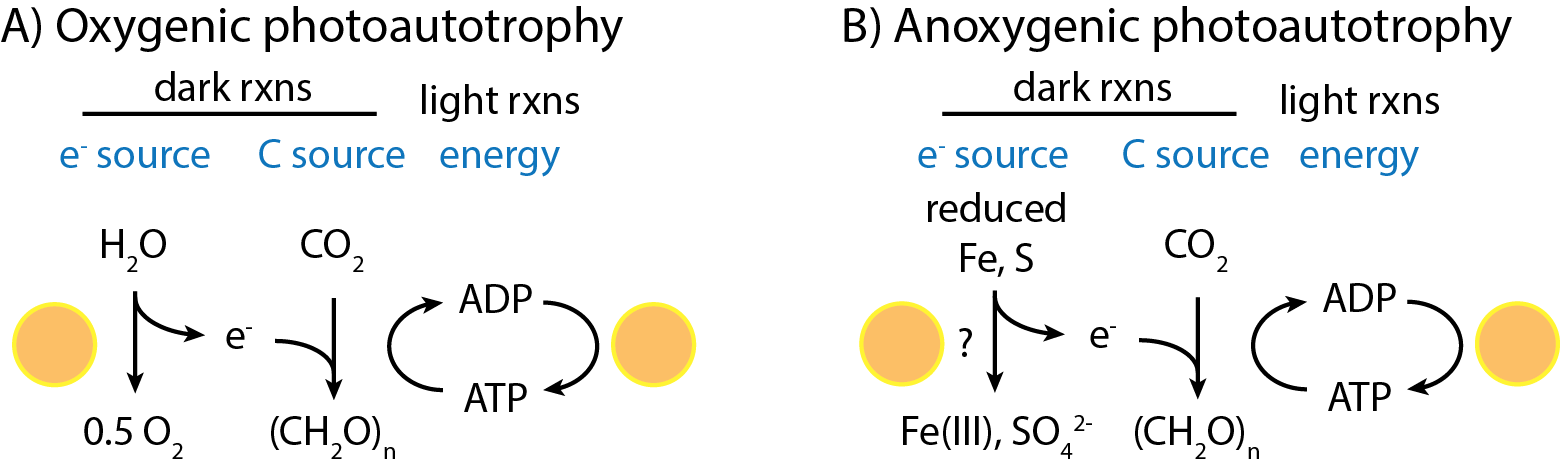
Photoautotrophy

Organisms that rely on light energy to fix carbon, and thus participate in primary production, are referred to as photoautotrophs.

Photoautotrophs exists across the tree of life. Many bacterial taxa are known to be photoautotrophic such as cyanobacteria and some Pseudomonadota (formerly proteobacteria). Eukaryotic organisms gained the ability to participate in photosynthesis through the development of plastids derived from endosymbiotic relationships. Archaeplastida, which includes red algae, green algae, and plants, have evolved chloroplasts originating from an ancient endosymbiotic relationship with an Alphaproteobacteria. The productivity of plants, while being photoautotrophs, is also dependent on factors such as salinity and abiotic stressors from the surrounding environment. The rest of the eukaryotic photoautotrophic organisms are within the SAR clade (Comprising Stramenopila, Alveolata, and Rhizaria). Organisms in the SAR clade that developed plastids did so through a secondary or a tertiary endosymbiotic relationships with green algae and/or red algae. The SAR clade includes many aquatic and marine primary producers such as Kelp, Diatoms, and Dinoflagellates.

==== Lithoautotrophs ====
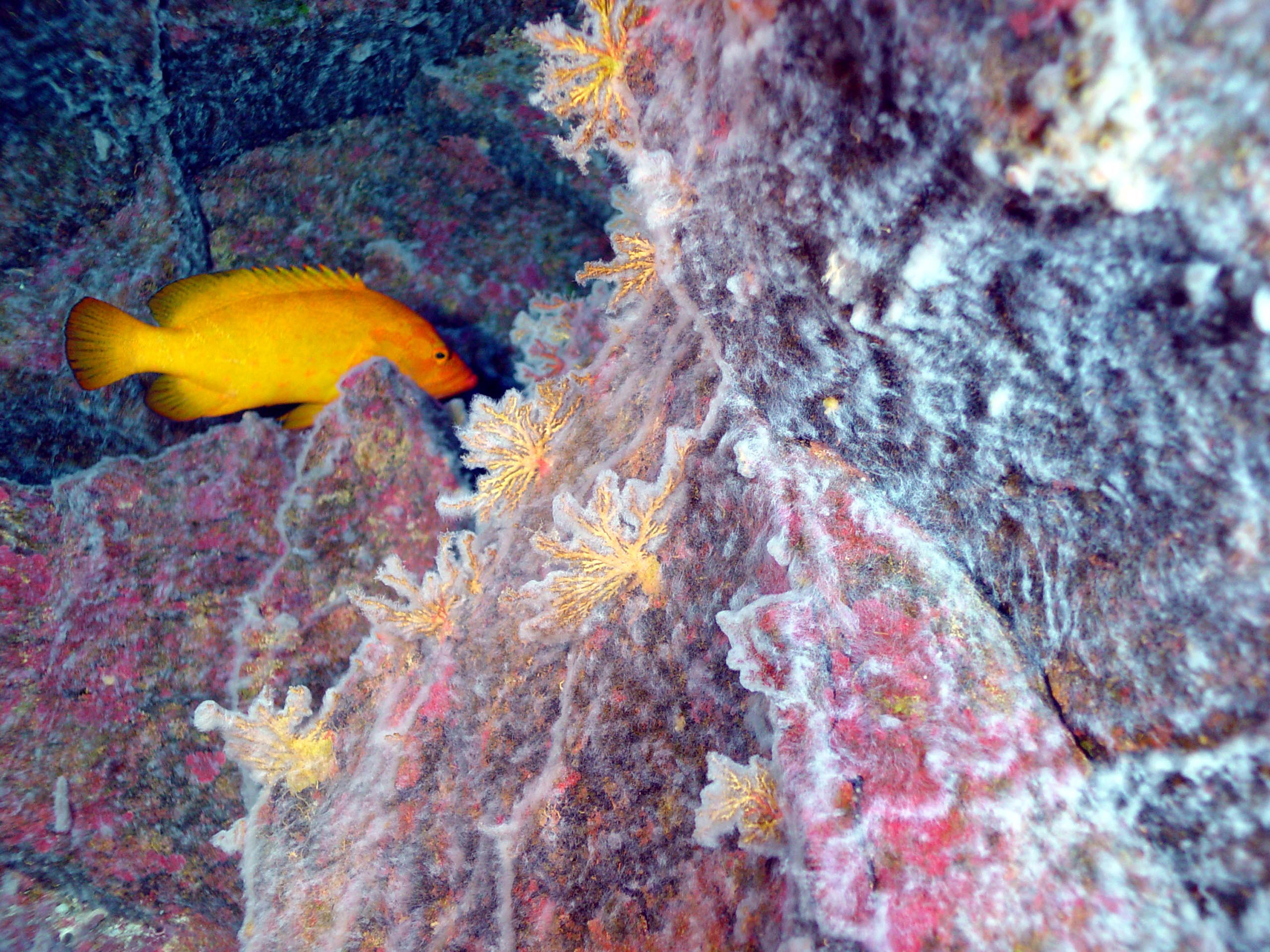
Chemosynthetic Microbial Mat

The other process of primary production is lithoautotrophy. Lithoautotrophs use reduced chemical compounds such as hydrogen gas, hydrogen sulfide, methane, or ferrous ion to fix carbon and participate in primary production. Lithoautotrophic organisms are prokaryotic and are represented by members of both the bacterial and archaeal domains. Lithoautotrophy is the only form of primary production possible in ecosystems without light such as ground-water ecosystems, hydrothermal vent ecosystems, soil ecosystems, and cave ecosystems.

== Secondary production ==
Secondary production is the generation of biomass of heterotrophic (consumer) organisms in a system. This is driven by the transfer of organic material between trophic levels, and represents the quantity of new tissue created through the use of assimilated food. Secondary production is sometimes defined to only include consumption of primary producers by herbivorous consumers (with tertiary production referring to carnivorous consumers), but is more commonly defined to include all biomass generation by heterotrophs.

Organisms responsible for secondary production include animals, protists, fungi and many bacteria.

Secondary production can be estimated through a number of different methods including increment summation, removal summation, the instantaneous growth method and the Allen curve method. The choice between these methods will depend on the assumptions of each and the ecosystem under study. For instance, whether cohorts should be distinguished, whether linear mortality can be assumed and whether population growth is exponential.

Net ecosystem production is defined as the difference between gross primary production (GPP) and ecosystem respiration. The formula to calculate net ecosystem production is NEP = GPP - respiration (by autotrophs) - respiration (by heterotrophs). The key difference between NPP and NEP is that NPP focuses primarily on autotrophic production, whereas NEP incorporates the contributions of other aspects of the ecosystem to the total carbon budget.

== Productivity ==
Following is the list of ecosystems in order of decreasing productivity.

Producer	Biomass productivity (gC/m²/yr)
Swamps and Marshes	2,500
Coral reefs	2,000
Algal beds	2,000
River estuaries	1,800
Temperate forests	1,250
Cultivated lands	650
Tundras	140
Open ocean	125

== Species diversity and productivity relationship ==
The connection between plant productivity and biodiversity is a significant topic in ecology, although it has been controversial for decades. Both productivity and species diversity are constricted by other variables such as climate, ecosystem type, and land use intensity. According to some research on the correlation between plant diversity and ecosystem functioning is that productivity increases as species diversity increases. One reasoning for this is that the likelihood of discovering a highly productive species increases as the number of species initially present in an ecosystem increases.

Other researchers believe that the relationship between species diversity and productivity is unimodal within an ecosystem. A 1999 study on grassland ecosystems in Europe, for example, found that increasing species diversity initially increased productivity but gradually leveled off at intermediate levels of diversity. More recently, a meta-analysis of 44 studies from various ecosystem types observed that the interaction between diversity and production was unimodal in all but one study.

== Human interactions ==
Anthropogenic activities (human activities) have impacted the productivity and biomass of several ecosystems. Examples of these activities include habitat modification, freshwater consumption, an increase in nutrients due to fertilizers, and many others. Increased nutrients can stimulate an algal bloom in waterbodies, increasing primary production but making the ecosystem less stable. This would raise secondary production and have a trophic cascade effect across the food chain, ultimately increasing overall ecosystem productivity. In lakes, these human impacts can "mask" the effects of climate change. Algal biomass is causally related to climate in some lakes, with temporary or long-term shifts in productivity (regime shifts).

== See also ==
- Biomass (ecology)
- Community ecology
- Food web
- Agricultural productivity
