= Stream metabolism =

Stream metabolism, often referred to as aquatic ecosystem metabolism in both freshwater (lakes, rivers, wetlands, streams, reservoirs) and marine ecosystems, includes gross primary productivity (GPP) and ecosystem respiration (ER) and can be expressed as net ecosystem production (NEP = GPP - ER). Analogous to metabolism within an individual organism, stream metabolism represents how energy is created (primary production) and used (respiration) within an aquatic ecosystem. In heterotrophic ecosystems, GPP:ER is <1 (ecosystem using more energy than it is creating); in autotrophic ecosystems it is >1 (ecosystem creating more energy than it is using). Most streams are heterotrophic. A heterotrophic ecosystem often means that allochthonous (coming from outside the ecosystem) inputs of organic matter, such as leaves or debris fuel ecosystem respiration rates, resulting in respiration greater than production within the ecosystem. However, autochthonous (coming from within the ecosystem) pathways also remain important to metabolism in heterotrophic ecosystems. In an autotrophic ecosystem, conversely, primary production (by algae, macrophytes) exceeds respiration, meaning that ecosystem is producing more organic carbon than it is respiring.

Stream metabolism can be influenced by a variety of factors, including physical characteristics of the stream (slope, width, depth, and speed/volume of flow), biotic characteristics of the stream (abundance and diversity of organisms ranging from bacteria to fish), light and nutrient availability to fuel primary production, organic matter to fuel respiration, water chemistry and temperature, and natural or human-caused disturbance, such as dams, removal of riparian vegetation, nutrient pollution, wildfire or flooding.

Measuring stream metabolic state is important to understand how disturbance may change the available primary productivity, and whether and how that increase or decrease in NEP influences foodweb dynamics, allochthonous/autochthonous pathways, and trophic interactions. Metabolism (encompassing both ER and GPP) must be measured rather than primary productivity alone, because simply measuring primary productivity does not indicate excess production available for higher trophic levels. One commonly used method for determining metabolic state in an aquatic system is daily changes in oxygen concentration, from which GPP, ER, and net daily metabolism can be estimated.

Disturbances can affect trophic relationships in a variety of ways, such as simplifying foodwebs, causing trophic cascades, and shifting carbon sources and major pathways of energy flow (Power et al. 1985, Power et al. 2008). Part of understanding how disturbance will impact trophic dynamics lies in understanding disturbance impacts to stream metabolism (Holtgrieve et al. 2010). For example, in Alaska streams, disturbance of the benthos by spawning salmon caused distinct changes in stream metabolism; autotrophic streams became net heterotrophic during the spawning run, then reverted to autotrophy after the spawning season (Holtgrieve and Schindler 2011). There is evidence that this seasonal disturbance impacts trophic dynamics of benthic invertebrates and in turn their vertebrate predators (Holtgrieve and Schindler 2011, Moore and Schindler 2008). Wildfire disturbance may have similar metabolic and trophic impacts in streams.

== See also ==
- Overflow metabolism
- Lake metabolism
- Apparent oxygen utilisation
