= Overflow metabolism =

Cellular phenomena

Overflow metabolism refers to the seemingly wasteful strategy in which cells incompletely oxidize their growth substrate (e.g. glucose) instead of using the respiratory pathway, even in the presence of oxygen. As a result of employing this metabolic strategy, cells excrete (or "overflow") metabolites like lactate, acetate and ethanol. Incomplete oxidation of growth substrates yields less energy (e.g. ATP) than complete oxidation through respiration, and yet overflow metabolism—known as the Warburg effect in the context of cancer and the Crabtree effect in the context of yeast—occurs ubiquitously among fast-growing cells, including bacteria, fungi and mammalian cells.

Based on experimental studies of acetate overflow in Escherichia coli, recent research has offered a general explanation for the association of overflow metabolism with fast growth. According to this theory, the enzymes required for respiration are more costly than those required for partial oxidation of glucose. That is, if the cell were to produce enough of these enzymes to support fast growth with respiratory metabolism, it would consume much more energy, carbon and nitrogen (per unit time) than supporting fast growth with an incompletely oxidative metabolism (e.g. fermentation). Given that cells have limited energy resources and fixed physical volume for proteins, there is thought to be a trade-off between efficient energy capture through central metabolism (i.e. respiration) and fast growth achieved through high central-metabolic fluxes (e.g. through fermentation as in yeast).

As an alternative explanation, it was suggested that cells could be limited by the rate with which they can dissipate Gibbs energy to the environment. Using combined thermodynamic and stoichiometric metabolic models in flux balance analyses with (i) growth maximization as objective function and (ii) an identified limit in the cellular Gibbs energy dissipation rate, correct predictions of physiological parameters, intracellular metabolic fluxes and metabolite concentrations were achieved.

== See also ==
- Stream metabolism
- Metabolism
