= Apparent oxygen utilisation =

Method for measuring oxygen level change in water

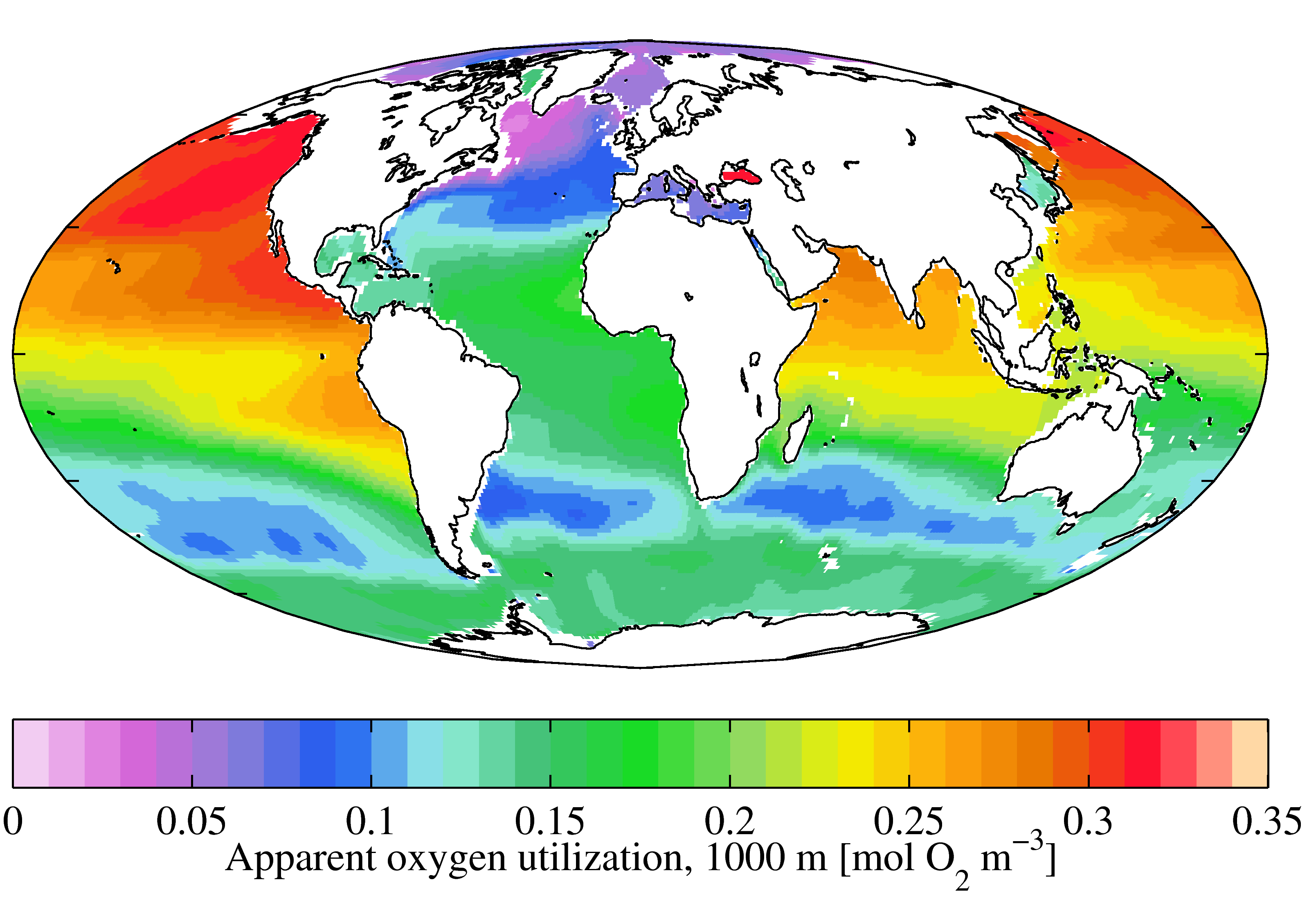
Apparent oxygen utilization at 1000 m depth. Data from the World Ocean Atlas 2009.

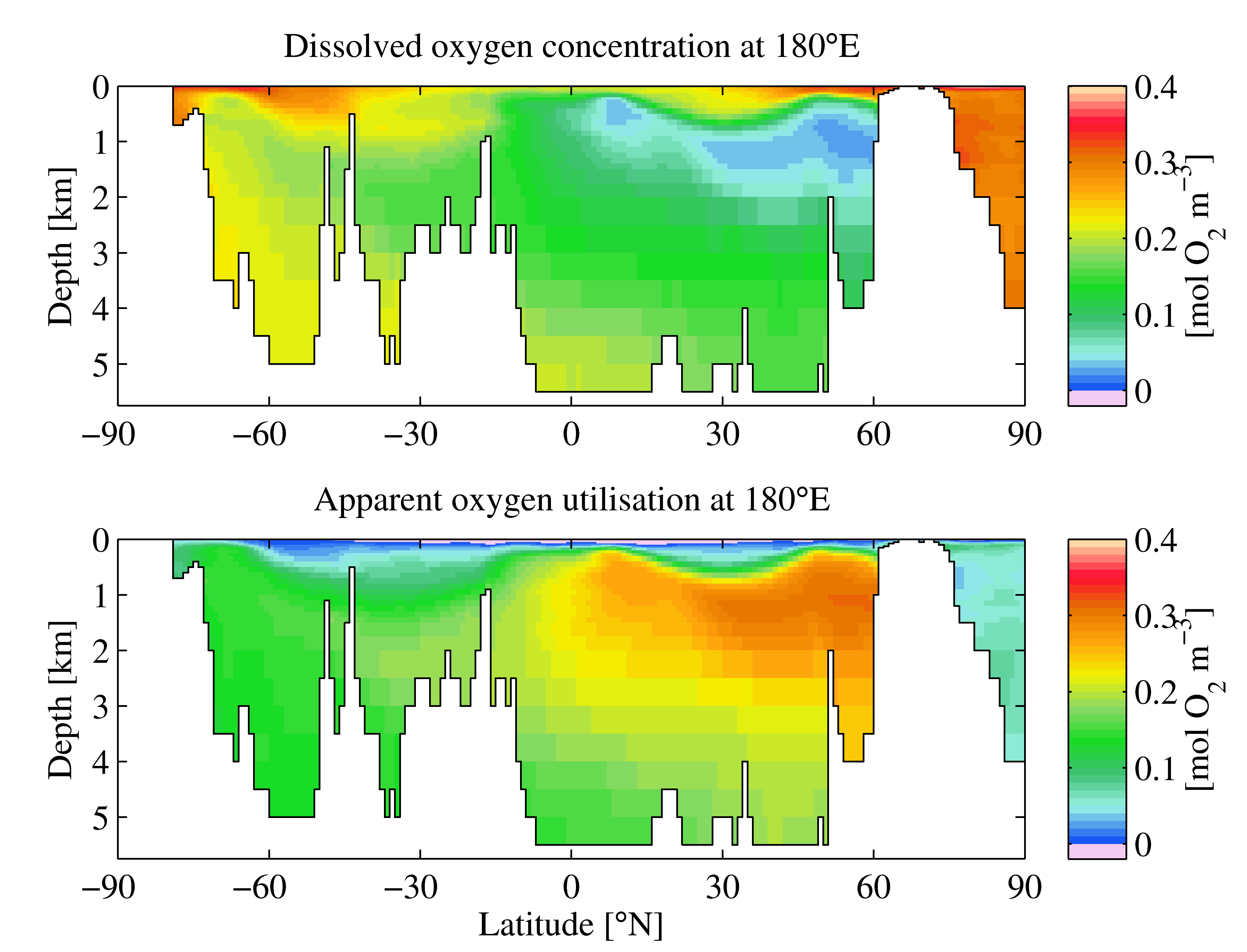
Pacific Ocean sections of dissolved oxygen and apparent oxygen utilization. Data from the World Ocean Atlas 2009.

In freshwater or marine systems apparent oxygen utilization (AOU) is the difference between oxygen gas solubility (i.e. the concentration at saturation) and the measured oxygen concentration in water with the same physical and chemical properties.

$AOU= [O_2 \ solubility]-[O_2 \ observed]$

== General influences ==
Differences in O_{2} solubility and measured concentration (AOU) typically occur when biological activity, ocean circulation, or ocean mixing act to change the ambient concentration of oxygen. For example, primary production liberates oxygen and increases its concentration, while respiration consumes it and decreases its concentration.

Consequently, the AOU of a water sample represents the sum of the biological activity that the sample has experienced since it was last in equilibrium with the atmosphere. In shallow water systems (e.g. lakes), the full water column is generally in close contact with the atmosphere, and oxygen concentrations are typically close to saturation, and AOU values are near zero. In deep water systems (e.g. oceans), water can be out of contact with the atmosphere for extremely long periods of time (years, decades, centuries) and large positive AOU values are typical. On occasion, where near-surface primary production has raised oxygen concentrations above saturation, negative AOU values are possible (i.e. oxygen has not been utilized to below saturation concentrations).

== O_{2} trends and AOU in the ocean ==
O_{2} concentrations in the ocean have decreased since the 1980s. Part of this decrease is due to increased ocean heat content (OHC) from global warming decreasing O_{2} solubility. As solubility in surface oceans decreases, O_{2} out gasses to the atmosphere. Increased AOU is likely also contributing to declining ocean O_{2} concentrations. Changes in AOU in the ocean could be caused by multiple forcings, such as changes in subduction rates, changes in water mass boundaries, initial O_{2} from water mass formation, biochemical consumption of O_{2}, or changes in eddy mixing. Based on observations, global AOU increase seems to be linked to increasing OHC.

=== Spatial trends in AOU and O_{2} ===
Changes in AOU are not consistent across spatial domains. Notably, the Northern Hemisphere AOU spikes in the mid-1990s, while Southern Hemisphere AOU significantly decreases in the mid-2000s. This could be due to less dense data in the Southern Hemisphere. Since the 80s, regions of major O_{2} decrease (AOU increase) include the subpolar North Pacific, equatorial Atlantic, and eastern equatorial Pacific. Regions of O_{2} increase (AOU decrease) include the western subtropical North Pacific and eastern subpolar North Atlantic.

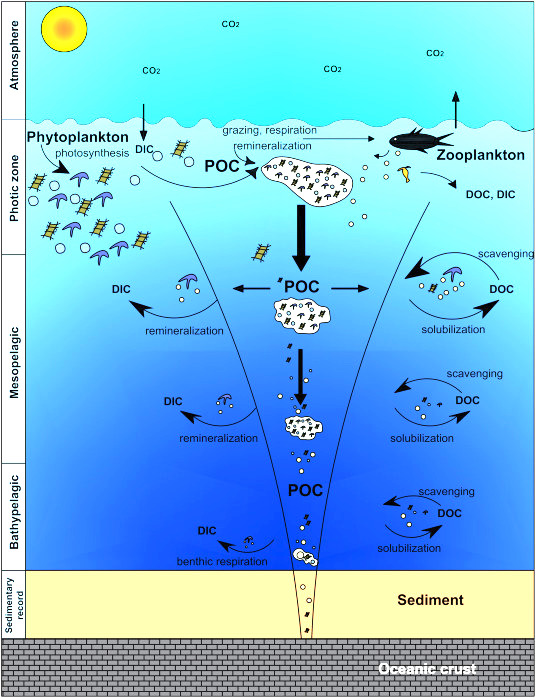
Diagram of the biological pump, a major control on AOU.

== See also ==
- Biological pump
- Eutrophication
- Lake metabolism
- Stream metabolism
- Hypoxia
- Remineralisation
- World Ocean Atlas
- Deep ocean water
- Thermohaline circulation
- Phytoplankton
