= Redfield ratio =

Concept in marine biology

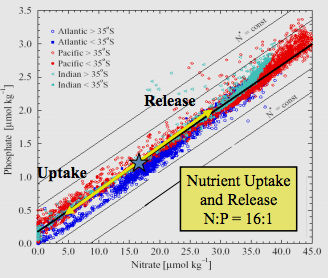
Relationship of phosphate to nitrate uptake for photosynthesis in various regions of the ocean. Note that nitrate is more often limiting than phosphate

The Redfield ratio or Redfield stoichiometry is the consistent atomic ratio of carbon, nitrogen and phosphorus found in marine phytoplankton and throughout the deep oceans.

The term is named for American oceanographer Alfred C. Redfield who in 1934 first described the relatively consistent ratio of nutrients in marine biomass samples collected across several voyages on board the research vessel Atlantis, and empirically found the ratio to be C:N:P = 106:16:1. While deviations from the canonical 106:16:1 ratio have been found depending on phytoplankton species and the study area, the Redfield ratio has remained an important reference to oceanographers studying nutrient limitation. More recent work based on data accumulated since the 1970s reported the global median C:N:P to be 163:22:1. However, the elemental ratio has been found to not only be more varied in the ocean; it has also been changing through time.

== Discovery ==
For his 1934 paper, Alfred Redfield analyzed nitrate and phosphate data for the Atlantic, Indian, Pacific oceans and Barents Sea. As a Harvard physiologist, Redfield participated in several voyages on board the research vessel Atlantis, analyzing data for C, N, and P content in marine plankton, and referenced data collected by other researchers as early as 1898.

Redfield’s analysis of the empirical data led him to discover that across and within the three oceans and Barents Sea, seawater had an N:P atomic ratio near 20:1 (later corrected to 16:1), and was very similar to the average N:P of phytoplankton.

To explain this phenomenon, Redfield initially proposed two mutually non-exclusive mechanisms:

I) The N:P in plankton tends towards the N:P composition of seawater. Specifically, phytoplankton species with different N and P requirements compete within the same medium and come to reflect the nutrient composition of seawater.

II) An equilibrium between seawater and planktonic nutrient pools is maintained through biotic feedback mechanisms. Redfield proposed a thermostat like scenario in which the activities of nitrogen fixers and denitrifiers keep the nitrate to phosphate ratio in the seawater near the requirements in the protoplasm. Considering that at the time little was known about the composition of "protoplasm", or the bulk composition of phytoplankton, Redfield did not attempt to explain why its N:P ratio should be approximately 16:1.

In 1958, almost a quarter century after first discovering the ratios, Redfield leaned toward the latter mechanism in his manuscript, The Biological Control of Chemical Factors in the Environment. Redfield proposed that the ratio of nitrogen to phosphorus in plankton resulted in the global ocean having a remarkably similar ratio of dissolved nitrate to phosphate (16:1). He considered how the cycles of not just N and P but also C and O could interact to result in this match.

== Explanation ==
Redfield discovered the remarkable congruence between the chemistry of the deep ocean and the chemistry of living things such as phytoplankton in the surface ocean. Both have N:P ratios of about 16:1 in terms of atoms. When nutrients are not limiting, the molar elemental ratio C:N:P in most phytoplankton is 106:16:1. Redfield thought it wasn't purely coincidental that the vast oceans would have a chemistry perfectly suited to the requirements of living organisms.

Laboratory experiments under controlled chemical conditions have found that phytoplankton biomass will conform to the Redfield ratio even when environmental nutrient levels exceed them, suggesting that ecological adaptation to oceanic nutrient ratios is not the only governing mechanism (contrary to one of the mechanisms initially proposed by Redfield). However, subsequent modeling of feedback mechanisms, specifically nitrate-phosphorus coupling fluxes, does support his proposed mechanism of biotic feedback equilibrium, though these results are confounded by limitations in our current understanding of nutrient fluxes.

In the ocean, a large portion of the biomass is found to be nitrogen-rich plankton. Many of these plankton are consumed by other plankton biomass which have similar chemical compositions. This results in a similar N:P ratio, on average, for all the plankton throughout the world’s oceans, empirically found to average approximately 16:1. When these organisms sink into the ocean interior, their biomass is consumed by bacteria that, in aerobic conditions, oxidize the organic matter to form dissolved inorganic nutrients, mainly carbon dioxide, nitrate, and phosphate.

That the nitrate to phosphate ratio in the interior of all of the major ocean basins is highly similar is possibly due to the residence times of these elements in the ocean relative to the ocean's circulation time, roughly 100 000 years for phosphorus and 2000 years for nitrogen. The fact that the residence times of these elements are greater than the mixing times of the oceans (~ 1000 years) can result in the ratio of nitrate to phosphate in the ocean interior remaining fairly uniform. It has been shown that phytoplankton play a key role in helping maintain this ratio. As organic matter sinks both nitrate and phosphate are released into the ocean via remineralization. Microorganisms preferentially consume oxygen in nitrate over phosphate leading to deeper oceanic waters having an N:P ratio of less than 16:1. From there, the ocean's currents upwell the nutrients to the surface where phytoplankton will consume the excess phosphorus and maintain a N:P ratio of 16:1 by consuming N_{2} via nitrogen fixation. While such arguments can potentially explain why the ratios are fairly constant, they do not address the question why the N:P ratio is nearly 16 and not some other number.

== Uses ==
The research that resulted in this ratio has become a fundamental feature in the understanding of the biogeochemical cycles of the oceans, and one of the key tenets of biogeochemistry. The Redfield ratio is instrumental in estimating carbon and nutrient fluxes in global circulation models. They also help in determining which nutrients are limiting in a localized system, if there is a limiting nutrient. The ratio can also be used to understand the formation of phytoplankton blooms and subsequently hypoxia by comparing the ratio between different regions, such as a comparison of the Redfield Ratio of the Mississippi River to the ratio of the northern Gulf of Mexico. Controlling N:P could be a means for sustainable reservoir management. It may even be the case that the Redfield Ratio is applicable to terrestrial plants, soils, and soil microbial biomass, which would inform about limiting resources in terrestrial ecosystems. In a study from 2007, soil and microbial biomass were found to have a consistent C:N:P ratios of 186:13:1 and 60:7:1, respectively on average at a global scale.

== Deviations from the canonical Redfield ratio ==
The Redfield ratio was initially derived empirically from measurements of the elemental composition of plankton in addition to the nitrate and phosphate content of seawater collected from a few stations in the Atlantic Ocean. This was later supported by hundreds of independent measurements of dissolved nitrate and phosphate. However, the composition of individual species of phytoplankton grown under nitrogen or phosphorus limitation shows that this N:P ratio can vary anywhere from 6:1 to 60:1. While understanding this problem, Redfield never attempted to explain it with the exception of noting that the N:P ratio of inorganic nutrients in the ocean interior was an average with small scale variability to be expected.

Although the Redfield ratio is remarkably stable in the deep ocean, it has been widely shown that phytoplankton may have large variations in the C:N:P composition, and their life strategy plays a role in the C:N:P ratio. This variability has made some researchers speculate that the Redfield ratio perhaps is a general average in the modern ocean rather than a fundamental feature of phytoplankton, though it has also been argued that it is related to a homeostatic protein-to-rRNA ratio fundamentally present in both prokaryotes and eukaryotes, which contributes to it being the most common composition. There are several possible explanations for the observed variability in C:N:P ratios. The speed at which the cell grows has an influence on cell composition and thereby its stoichiometry. Also, when phosphorus is scarce, phytoplankton communities can lower their P content, raising the N:P. Additionally, the accumulation and quantity of dead phytoplankton and detritus can affect the availability of certain food sources which in turn affects the composition of the cell. In some ecosystems, the Redfield ratio has also been shown to vary significantly by the dominant phytoplankton taxa present in an ecosystem, even in systems with abundant nutrients. Consequently, the system-specific Redfield ratio could serve as a proxy for plankton community structure.

Despite reports that the elemental composition of organisms such as marine phytoplankton in an oceanic region do not conform to the canonical Redfield ratio, the fundamental concept of this ratio remains valid and useful.

== Extended Redfield ratio ==
Some feel that there are other elements, such as potassium, sulfur, zinc, copper, and iron which are also important in the ocean chemistry.

In particular, iron (Fe) was considered of great importance as early biological oceanographers hypothesized that iron may also be a limiting factor for primary production in the ocean. Since then experimentation has proven that Iron is a limiting factor for primary production. Iron-rich solution was added to 64 km^{2} area which led to an increase in phytoplankton primary production. As a result an extended Redfield ratio was developed to include this as part of this balance. This new stoichiometric ratio states that the ratio should be 106 C:16 N:1 P:0.1-0.001 Fe. The large variation for Fe is a result of the significant obstacle of ships and scientific equipment contaminating any samples collected at sea with excess Fe. It was this contamination that resulted in early evidence suggesting that iron concentrations were high and not a limiting factor in marine primary production.

Diatoms need, among other nutrients, silicic acid to create biogenic silica for their frustules (cell walls). As a result of this, the Redfield-Brzezinski nutrient ratio was proposed for diatoms and stated to be C:Si:N:P = 106:15:16:1. Extending beyond primary production itself, the oxygen consumed by aerobic respiration of phytoplankton biomass has also been shown to follow a predictable proportion to other elements. The O_{2}:C ratio has been measured at 138:106.

== See also ==
- Ecological stoichiometry
- Biogeochemical cycle
