= Elizabeth M. Bright =

American physiologist

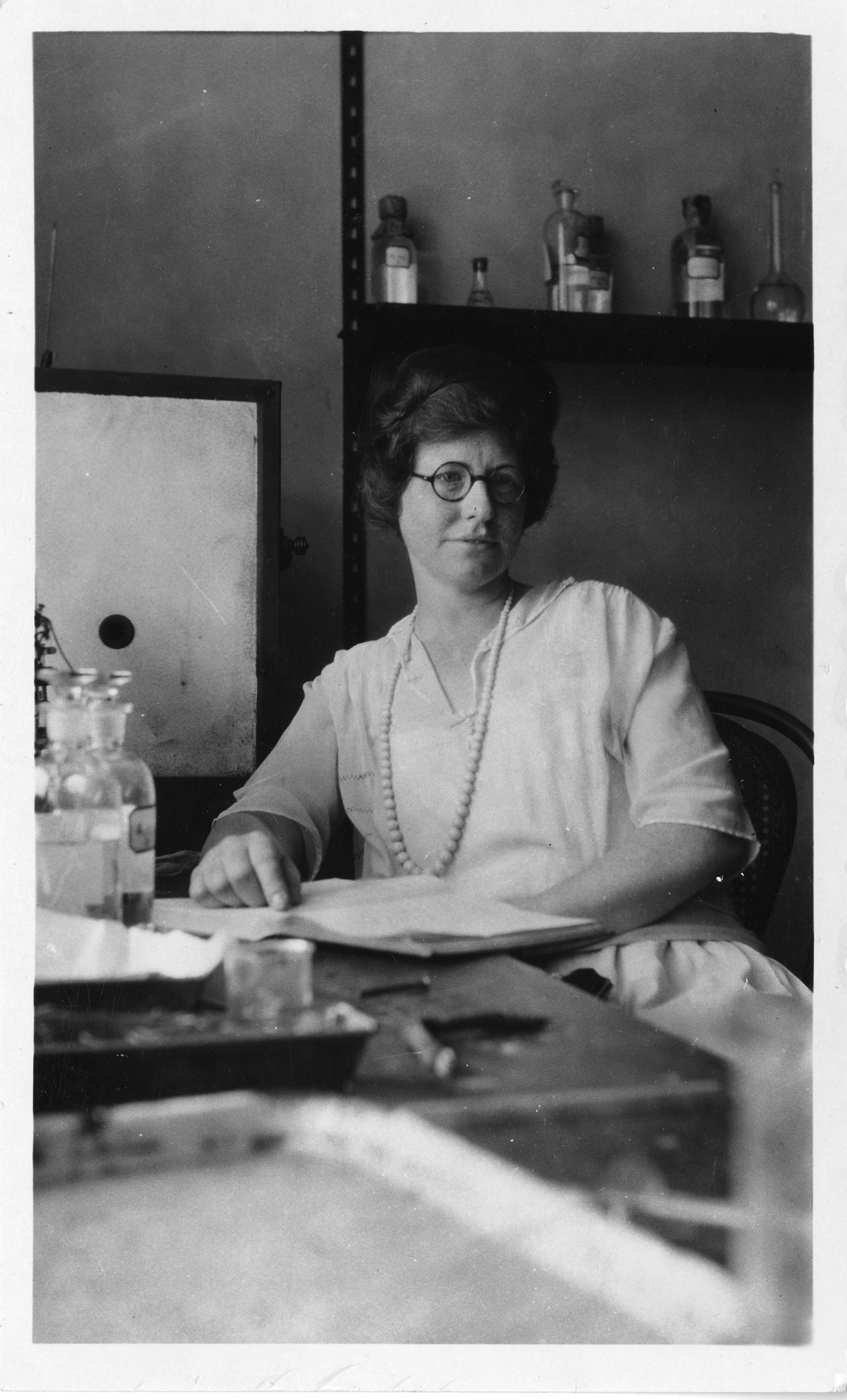
Elizabeth M. Bright, sitting at laboratory bench

Elizabeth M. Bright (25 September 1893 – 20 October 1975) early investigator, researcher and physiologist from Harvard and Woods Hole that collaborated with noted oceanographer Alfred C. Redfield to study the effects of radiation on various animal models

== Life and Times ==
Elizabeth M. Bright was born on 25 September 1893 in Chelsea, Suffolk, Massachusetts to David L. Bright and Emma Clark from Nova Scotia. Her father's occupation was listed as laborer. On 29 January 1911 in Chelsea, Massachusetts, at the age of 17 she married Norman M. Menzies, age 20 from Scotland whose occupation was listed as steamfitter. Bright died on 20 October 1975 at Lowell, Massachusetts.

== Woods Hole and Harvard ==
In 1912, Bright went to the Marine Biological Laboratory at Woods Hole, Massachusetts in the position of beginning investigator in the Physiology Department and also worked as a research assistant at Harvard University Medical School in the Physiology Department. From 1918 to 1924 Bright worked with noted oceanographer Alfred C. Redfield on studies that involved the Nereis and other animal models and radiation health effects and in collaboration published 12 papers.

== Publications ==
- A quantitative study of the effect of radium radiations upon the fertilization membrane of Nereis.
- Temperature Coefficient of the Action of ß-rays Upon the Eggs of Nereis.
- The Relative Physiological Effects of ß- and γ-rays Upon the Egg of Nereis.
- The Relative Physiological Effects of β-rays of Different Velocities.
- The physiological changes produced by radium rays and ultra‐violet light in the egg of Nereis.
- The effects of radium rays on metabolism and growth in seeds. The Journal of general physiology.
- The effect of adrenalectomy upon the total metabolism of the cat.
- The metabolic effect of adrenalectomy upon the urethanized cat.
- Studies upon the mechanism of the increased metabolism in hyperthyroidism.
- Hemolytic Action of Radium Emanation.
- The physiological action of ionizing radiations.
- Studies on Conditions of Activity in Endocrine Glands.
- Studies on Conditions of Activity in Endocrine Glands.
