= Ecosystem metabolism =

Metabolism in ecosystems

Ecosystem metabolism is a term that characterizes a specific biome or compartment of the ecosystem by measuring the net metabolic production of all the organisms within the defined compartment. This can also be framed as the net processing of energy and matter within the ecosystem. On an individual scale, metabolism refers to how an organism intakes and processes energy from food, allowing the body to perform essential functions of life.

When expanded from an individual organism to an entire biome, the use of metabolism as a framework allows examination of energy and food web dynamics and movement of nutrients through the biogeochemical cycle. Ecosystem metabolism can be measured for any specific compartment of the environment – e.g. one lake, a sediment column under the ocean, or any defined zone.

== Production and respiration ==
Organisms undergo many complicated energy transforming processes, but for the purposes of ecosystem metabolism the two most important are production and respiration. Production refers to gross primary production (GPP) by which primary producers use photosynthesis to “fix” carbon by producing sugar. Respiration refers to the reaction by which organisms uptake oxygen and use it to turn sugar into energy, generally producing carbon dioxide in the process, also called mineralization of carbon. The balance of production (gross primary production, GPP) and respiration (ecosystem respiration, ER) quantifies the total movement of carbon through the system, which allows distinction between compartments that are net autotrophic (GPP > ER) and net heterotrophic (ER > GPP).

Net autotrophic ecosystems produce more “fixed” carbon and are thus carbon sinks, meaning they store organic and inorganic carbon. Net heterotrophic ecosystems produce more carbon dioxide and are thus carbon sources. Net autotrophic biomes are usually forests, grasslands and similar, while examples of net heterotrophic biomes include rivers, lakes, and cities. The movement of carbon through the environment is of great importance to the biogeochemical cycle, and provides avenues toward understanding long-term changes to the carbon cycle.

== Measuring ecosystem respiration ==
Ecosystem metabolism can be measured in a variety of ways, with significant enhancements and improvements within the last century. Many researchers use metabolite flux as measured for various important metabolites such as O2, carbon dioxide, ammonium, nitrate, or phosphate. Ecosystem metabolism parameters can also be inferred by tracking temporal trends and fluxes of material across ecosystem boundaries. The original method used since the early 20th century (especially in aquatic systems) was to measure dissolved oxygen, which can be measured easily and cheaply. The logic behind using dissolved oxygen as a proxy is that O2 is produced during photosynthesis and consumed during aerobic respiration, so the net balance of oxygen describes the overall balance between these two processes.

However, it is limited by the fact that some microbes perform anaerobic respiration, and their metabolic contribution is not captured by measuring oxygen. Depending on the system being measured and the significance of anaerobic respiration within that system, this may be more or less important. For this reason, other methods have been developed such as TCO2 (total carbon dioxide) where the flux of carbon dioxide is measured.

== See also ==
- Biogeochemistry
