= Ecological stoichiometry =

Field of study

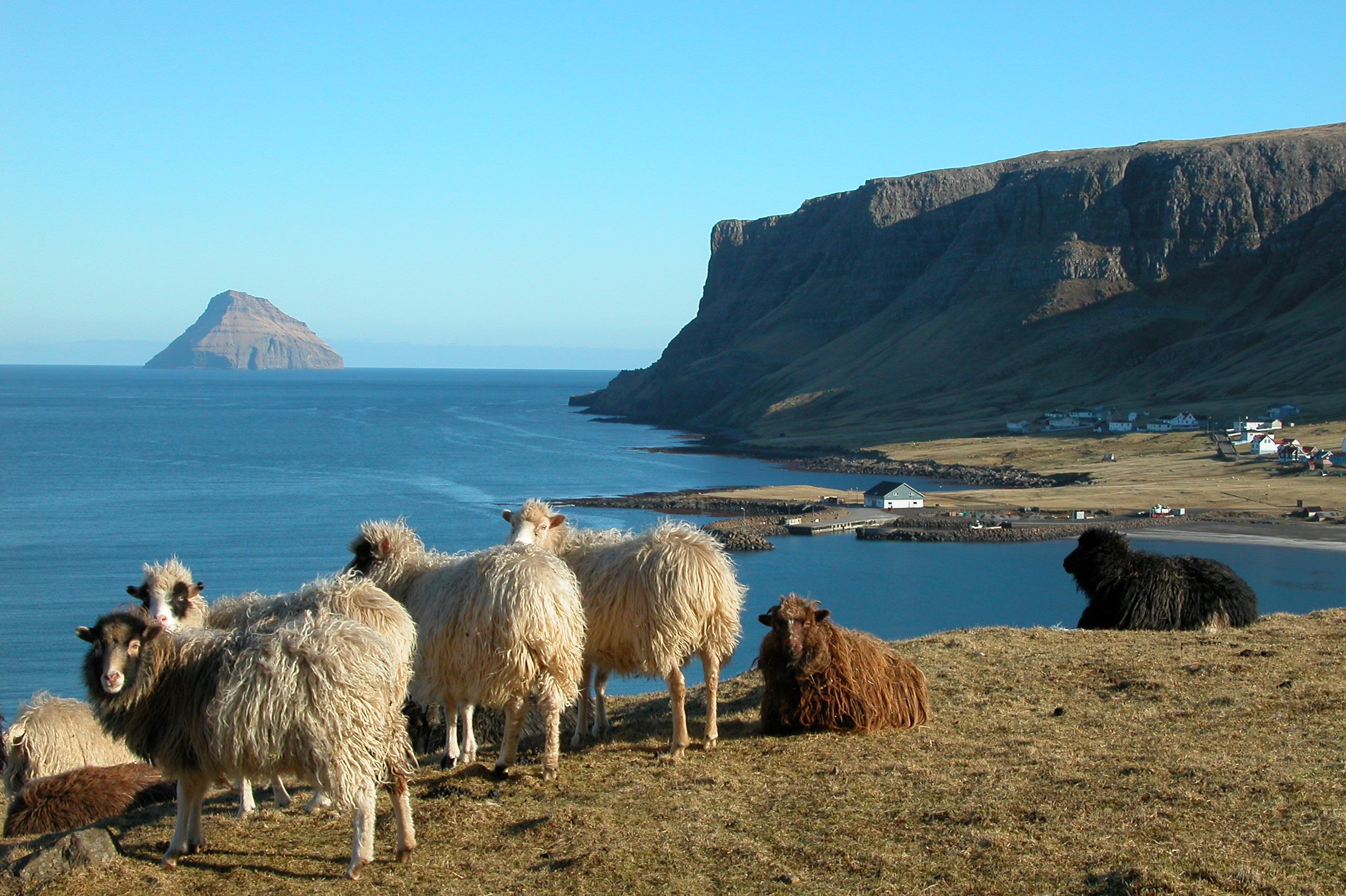
Sheep feed on plant tissues that contain high concentrations of carbon relative to concentrations of nitrogen and phosphorus (i.e. a high ratio of C:N:P). To grow and develop, the tissues of a sheep need less carbon in relation to nitrogen and phosphorus (i.e. a low ratio of C:N:P) than the food eaten. The growth and development of any organism may be limited by an imbalance in these proportions.

Ecological stoichiometry (more broadly referred to as biological stoichiometry) considers how the balance of energy and elements influences living systems. Similar to chemical stoichiometry, ecological stoichiometry is founded on constraints of mass balance as they apply to organisms and their interactions in ecosystems. Specifically, how does the balance of energy and elements affect and how is this balance affected by organisms and their interactions. Concepts of ecological stoichiometry have a long history in ecology with early references to the constraints of mass balance made by Liebig, Lotka, and Redfield. These earlier concepts have been extended to explicitly link the elemental physiology of organisms to their food web interactions and ecosystem function.

Most work in ecological stoichiometry focuses on the interface between an organism and its resources. This interface, whether it is between plants and their nutrient resources or large herbivores and grasses, is often characterized by dramatic differences in the elemental composition of each part. The difference, or mismatch, between the elemental demands of organisms and the elemental composition of resources leads to an elemental imbalance. Consider termites, which have a tissue carbon:nitrogen ratio (C:N) of about 5 yet consume wood with a C:N ratio of 300–1000. Ecological stoichiometry primarily asks:

1. why do elemental imbalances arise in nature?
2. how is consumer physiology and life-history affected by elemental imbalances? and
3. what are the subsequent effects on ecosystem processes?

Elemental imbalances arise for a number of physiological and evolutionary reasons related to the differences in the biological make up of organisms, such as differences in types and amounts of macromolecules, organelles, and tissues. Organisms differ in the flexibility of their biological make up and therefore in the degree to which organisms can maintain a constant chemical composition in the face of variations in their resources. Variations in resources can be related to the types of needed resources, their relative availability in time and space, and how they are acquired. The ability to maintain internal chemical composition despite changes in the chemical composition and availability of resources is referred to as "stoichiometric homeostasis". Like the general biological notion of homeostasis, elemental homeostasis refers to the maintenance of elemental composition within some biologically ordered range. Photoautotrophic organisms, such as algae and vascular plants, can exhibit a very wide range of physiological plasticity in elemental composition and thus have relatively weak stoichiometric homeostasis. In contrast, other organisms, such as multicellular animals, have close to strict homeostasis and they can be thought of as having distinct chemical composition. For example, carbon to phosphorus ratios in the suspended organic matter in lakes (i.e., algae, bacteria, and detritus) can vary between 100 and 1000 whereas C:P ratios of Daphnia, a crustacean zooplankton, remain nearly constant at 80:1. The general differences in stoichiometric homeostasis between plants and animals can lead to large and variable elemental imbalances between consumers and resources.

Ecological stoichiometry seeks to discover how the chemical content of organisms shapes their ecology. Ecological stoichiometry has been applied to studies of nutrient recycling, resource competition, animal growth, and nutrient limitation patterns in whole ecosystems. The Redfield ratio of the world's oceans is one very famous application of stoichiometric principles to ecology. Ecological stoichiometry also considers phenomena at the sub-cellular level, such as the P-content of a ribosome, as well as phenomena at the whole biosphere level, such as the oxygen content of Earth's atmosphere.

To date the research framework of ecological stoichiometry stimulated research in various fields of biology, ecology, biochemistry and human health, including human microbiome research, cancer research, food web interactions, population dynamics, ecosystem services, productivity of agricultural crops and honeybee nutrition.

== Consumer stoichiometry and food webs ==
The study of elemental ratios (i.e., C:N:P) within the tissues of organisms can be used to understand how organisms respond to changes in resource quality and quantity. For instance, in aquatic ecosystems, nitrogen and phosphorus pollution within streams, often due to agricultural activities, can increase the amount of N and P available to primary producers. This release in the limitation of N and P can impact the abundance, growth rates, and biomass of primary producers within the stream. This change in primary production can trickle through the food web via bottom-up processes and impact the stoichiometry of organisms, limiting elements, and biogeochemical cycling of streams. In addition, bottom-up changes in elemental availability can influence the morphology, phenology, and physiology of organisms that will be discussed below. The focus of this article is on aquatic systems; however, similar processes related to ecological stoichiometry can be applied in the terrestrial environment, as well.

== Invertebrate stoichiometry ==
The demands for carbon, nitrogen and phosphorus at specific ratios by invertebrates can change at different life stages within invertebrate life history. The growth rate hypothesis (GRH) addresses this phenomenon and states that the demands for phosphorus increase during active growth phases to produce P-rich nucleic acids in biomass production and are reflected in the P content of the consumer. During early growth stages, or earlier instars, invertebrates may have higher demands for N and P enriched resources to fuel the ribosomal production of proteins and RNA. At later stages, the demand for particular elements may shift as they are no longer actively growing as rapidly or generating protein rich biomass. Growth rates of invertebrate organisms can also be limited by the resources that are available to them.

== See also ==
- Energy flow (ecology)
- Energy homeostasis
