= Alfred C. Redfield =

American oceanographer

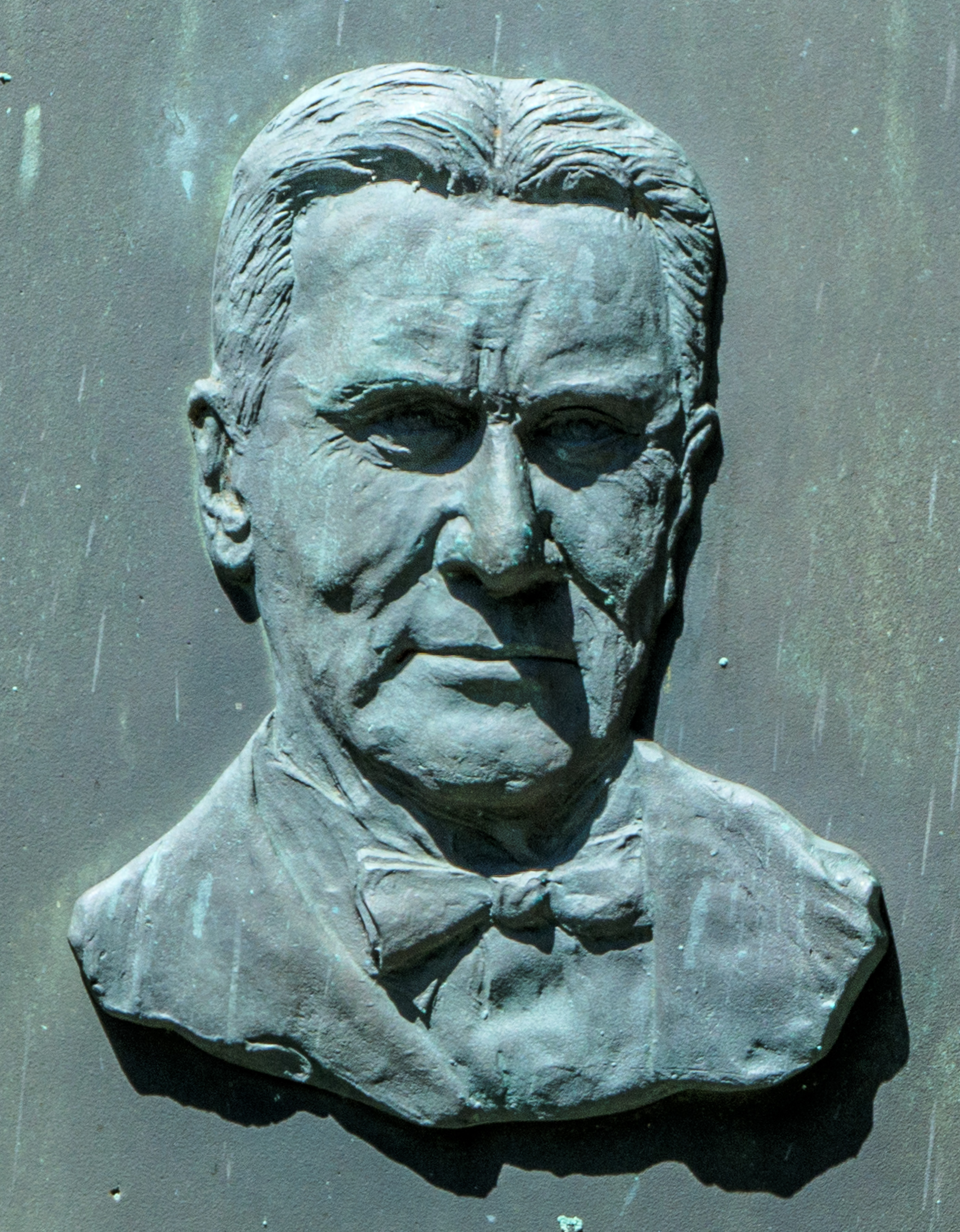
- Relief sculpture
- Born: November 15, 1890; Philadelphia, Pennsylvania
- Died: March 17, 1983 (aged 92); Woods Hole, Massachusetts
- Education: Harvard University (BS, Ph.D)
- Known for: Redfield ratio
- Spouses: Elizabeth Sewall Redfield (née Pratt) (m. 1913; died 1920); Martha Redfield (née Putnam) (m. 1922)
- Children: 3, including Alfred G. Redfield
- Awards: Alexander Agassiz Medal 1955; Eminent Ecologist Award 1966
- Scientific career
- Fields: Oceanography

Alfred Clarence Redfield (November 15, 1890 – March 17, 1983) was an American oceanographer known for having discovered the Redfield ratio, which describes the ratio between nutrients in plankton and ocean water. He was a professor of physiology at Harvard University and one of the original staff of the Woods Hole Oceanographic Institution upon its founding in 1930.

== Biography ==
Redfield was born in Philadelphia and grew up in Wayne, Pennsylvania. The family often spent summers on Cape Cod, where the young Redfield became fascinated with natural history.

After attending Haverford College for one year (1909-1910), he entered Harvard University, where he received his bachelor of science degree in 1913 and Ph.D. in 1917. He was assistant professor of physiology at the University of Toronto, and joined the Harvard faculty in 1921, becoming a full professor in 1931. He was chairman of the biology department from 1935-1938, and retired in 1956 as professor emeritus.

During the years 1930 to 1970, Redfield was intimately involved with Woods Hole Oceanographic Institution at Woods Hole, Massachusetts, known familiarly then as "The Oceanographic" and today as "WHOI." Like the other WHOI scientists, he spent the summers at "The Oceanographic" and the academic year teaching at Harvard. At WHOI, he was named senior biologist from 1930 to 1942, associate director between 1942 and 1957, senior oceanographer emeritus in 1957, and honorary trustee in 1963.

He was named president of the Ecological Society of America in 1946, and was president of the Bermuda Institute of Ocean Sciences from 1962 to 1965. He was also locally involved in the Woods Hole Public Library and the Cape Cod Chamber of Commerce.

Redfield died at age 92 in March 1983, leaving his wife, three children, ten grandchildren, and seven great-grandchildren.

== Research ==
His research was used by James Lovelock in the formulation of the Gaia hypothesis, that "Organisms and their environment evolve as a single, self-regulating system." From 1918 to 1924, Redfield worked with Elizabeth M. Bright on studies that involved the effects of radiation and Nereis. In collaboration the team published 12 papers.

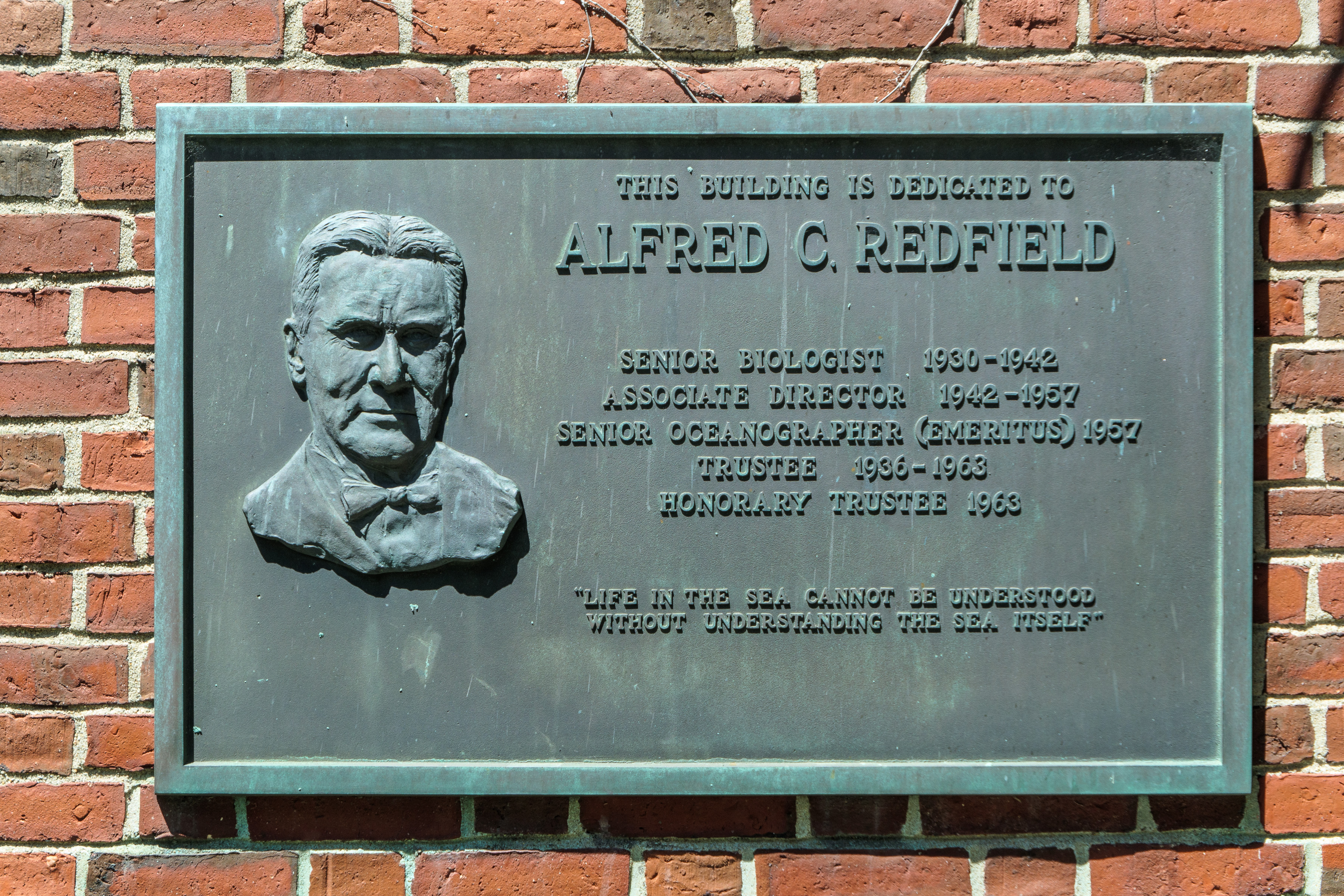
Dedication plaque at WHOI's Redfield Laboratory

During his doctoral research, he studied the mechanism of horned toad skin coloration, identifying adrenaline as the primary control of skin coloration. He later studied the effects of X rays and radium radiation on the physiological action.

Following his graduation, he went on to study marine biology. He studied hemocyanin, which is the blood pigment of many invertebrate species, which binds oxygen, and characterized its physiological behavior.

=== Redfield ratio ===
During the 1930s, Redfield made his most important discovery. He discovered that the atomic ratios of the chemical components of phosphorus, nitrogen and carbon atoms are identical with their relative proportions in the open ocean. This idea was used to explain some characteristics of the carbon life cycle in the sea. This ratio has come to be known as the Redfield ratio, and Oceans in which this ratio holds are sometimes known as "Redfield Oceans." This discovery led to an aphorism for which Redfield became well known: “Life in the sea cannot be understood without understanding the sea itself."

=== World War II ===
During World War II, the staff at "The Oceanographic" grew by thirty times, and military research became its top priority. Redfield moved permanently to Woods Hole from Cambridge, and was appointed WHOI's assistant director (though he retained his Harvard professorship). At this time Redfield, together with Allyn Vine, focused on studying how temperature gradients affect the accuracy of sonar in detection and tracking submerged submarines. Redfield and Vine demonstrated that submerged submarines could take advantage of ocean temperature gradients to avoid detection by enemy sonar.

Late in life, Redfield turned to studying tides in coastal waters, and the ecology of salt marshes along the U.S. east coast, publishing his last scientific paper “The Tides of the Waters of New England and New York” at age 89.

== Family and personal life ==
=== Family ===
ARedfield came from a notable scientific family. His great-grandfather was pioneering amateur meteorologist William Charles Redfield (1789 – 1857), the first president of the American Association for the Advancement of Science. His grandfather was a botanist in the Academy of Natural Sciences in Philadelphia; his father Robert Redfield was a naturalist photographer, whose works are held by Library Company of Philadelphia and Yale University.

His son Alfred G. Redfield (d. 2019) was professor of physics and biochemistry at Brandeis University and a member of the National Academy of Sciences. His daughter Elizabeth R. Marsh (died 2009) was said to have been "influential in founding" Stockton University in New Jersey, where she taught environmental studies, natural sciences, and mathematics.

=== Personal life ===
Redfield's married his first wife Elizabeth Pratt in 1913. She died in the 1918 flu pandemic. He married Martha Putnam in 1922; they had three children. Martha outlived him by only a few months.

== Awards and honors ==
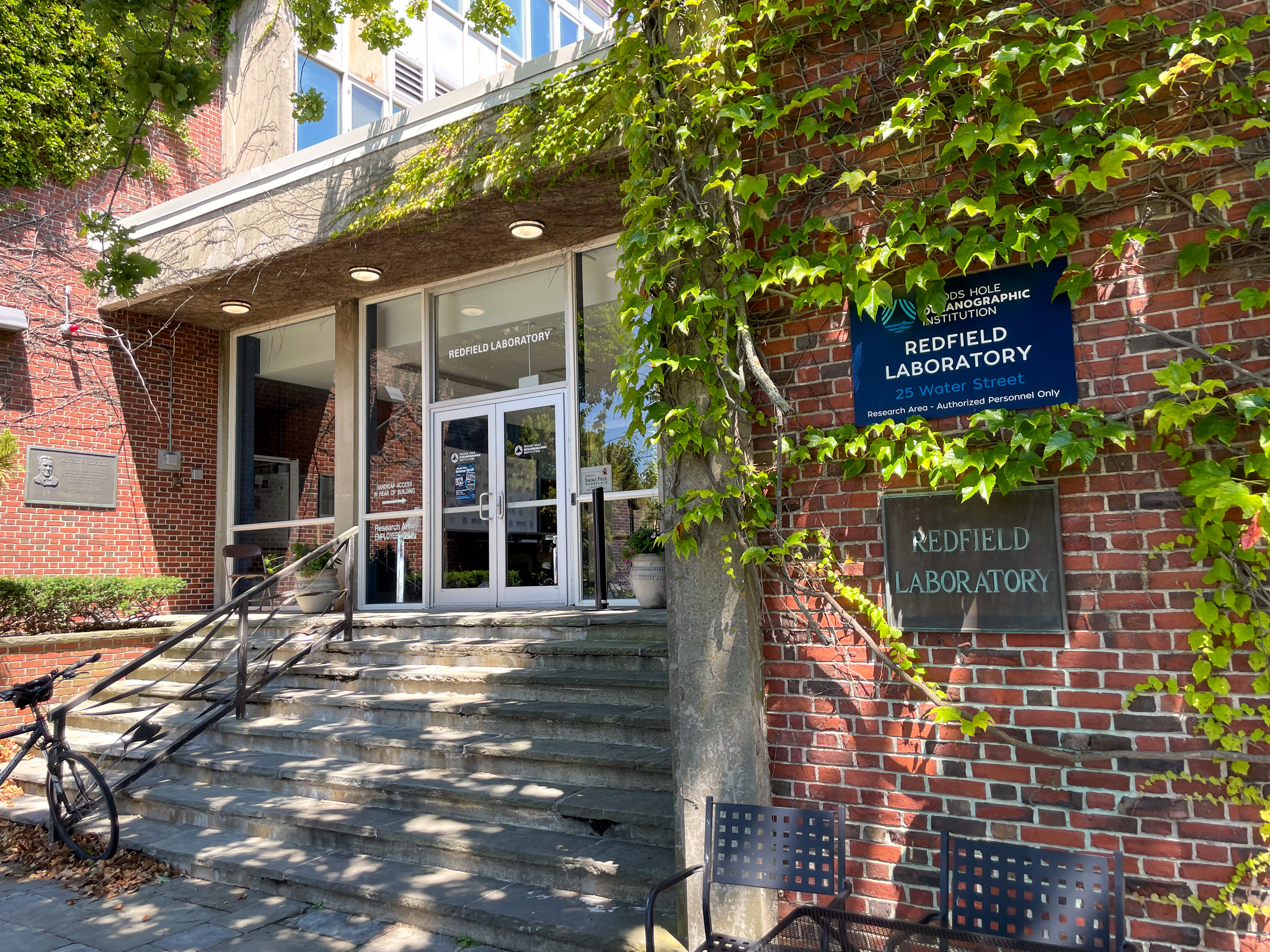
Redfield Laboratory

- In 1956 he was awarded the Alexander Agassiz Medal from the National Academy of Sciences
- In 1966 he received the Eminent Ecologist Award from the Ecological Society of America
- A.C. Redfield Lifetime Achievement Award, presented annually by the American Society of Limnology and Oceanography, was named in his honor
- The Redfield Laboratory at the Woods Hole Oceanographic Institution was dedicated in his honor in 1971. It includes labs, offices, a conference room, and an auditorium for the biology department.
- In 1973 he received the Walker Prize in Natural History from the Museum of Science in Boston
- Redfield held honorary degrees from the University of Oslo, Lehigh University, Memorial University of Newfoundland, and the University of Alaska
