= Ecosystem respiration =

Oxidation of organic compounds within an ecosystem

Ecosystem respiration is the sum of all respiration occurring by the living organisms in a specific ecosystem. The two main processes that contribute to ecosystem respiration are photosynthesis and cellular respiration. Photosynthesis uses carbon-dioxide and water, in the presence of sunlight to produce glucose and oxygen whereas cellular respiration uses glucose and oxygen to produce carbon-dioxide, water, and energy. The coordination of inputs and outputs of these two processes creates a completely interconnected system, constituting the underlying functioning of the ecosystems overall respiration.

It is the operation in which the organisms within a specified ecosystem use the process of respiration to convert organic carbon to carbon dioxide. While the amount of respiration is varied upon the type of ecosystem and the community abundance, the mechanism occurs in both aquatic and terrestrial environments.

== Overview ==
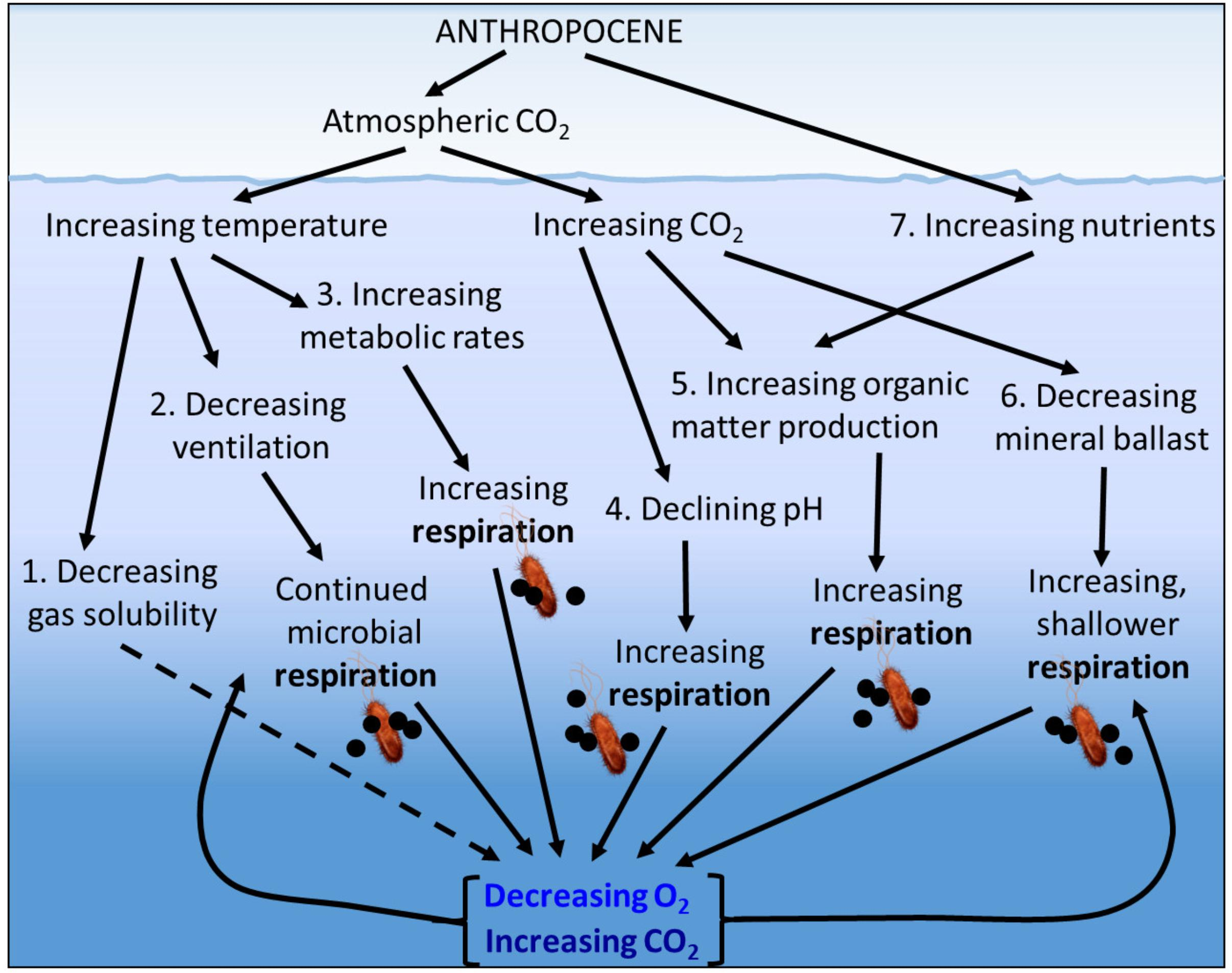
Ocean microbial respiration

Cellular respiration is the overall relationship between autotrophs and heterotrophs. Autotrophs are organisms that produce their own food through the process of photosynthesis, whereas heterotrophs are organisms that cannot prepare their own food and depend on autotrophs for nutrition. These two categories of living things work in coordination between photosynthesis and respiration as they both produce products that the other process utilizes. Cellular respiration happens when a cell takes glucose and oxygen and uses it to produce carbon dioxide, energy, and water. This transaction is important not only for the benefit of the cells, but for the carbon dioxide output provided, which is key in the process of photosynthesis. Without respiration, actions necessary to life, such as metabolic processes and photosynthesis, would cease. Ecosystem respiration is typically measured in the natural environment, such as a forest or grassland, rather than in the laboratory. Ecosystem respiration is the production portion of carbon dioxide in an ecosystem's carbon flux, while photosynthesis typically accounts for the majority of the ecosystem's carbon consumption. Carbon is cycled throughout the ecosystem as various factors continue to uptake or release the carbon in different circumstances. Ecosystems take in carbon through photosynthesis, decomposition, and ocean uptake. Ecosystems return this carbon through animal respiration, and plant respiration. This constant cycle of carbon through the system is not the only element being transferred. In animal and plant respiration these living beings take in glucose and oxygen while emitting energy, carbon dioxide, and water as waste. These constant cycles provide for a influx of oxygen into the system and carbon out of the system.

== Importance ==
In natural ecosystems, the greatest utilization of carbon is through the uptake of carbon in photosynthesis and the second greatest utilization of carbon is through the release of carbon in cellular respiration. minute changes to these two fluxes can have a larger effect on the carbon dioxide in the atmosphere. These two processes have a significant effect on the atmospheric carbon dioxide concentration, making their correct functioning essential to sustaining life. Without carbon dioxide, plants would not be able to carry out photosynthesis, in turn not producing oxygen, affecting all forms of life on earth. Without the presence of ecosystem respiration throughout earth's systems, it is safe to say the basic idea of "life" would be lost. Prior to these processes in earth's early years of formation, the air and oceans were anoxic. An anoxic environment is one without the presence of oxygen, majorly consisting of anaerobic microbes. The evolution of oxygenic photosynthesis in the atmosphere amplified the productivity of the biosphere, increasing biodiversity. With the presence of photosynthesis providing oxygen to the atmosphere, respiration soon evolved to provide the necessary components photosynthesis demanded to function. This coevolution of photosynthesis and respiration processes has led us to the biodiverse and fruitful ecosystems we know today.

== See also ==
- Carbon dioxide in Earth's atmosphere
- Ecosystem ecology
- Eddy covariance flux (eddy correlation, eddy flux)
- Flux
- Biogeochemistry
- Respiration rate

== External references ==
- https://web.archive.org/web/20100612133703/http://face.env.duke.edu/projpage.cfm?id=38
- http://eco.confex.com/eco/2008/techprogram/P10688.HTM
- Biogeochemistry. Heinrich D. Holland, William H. Schlesinger, Karl K. Turekian. 702 pp. Elsevier, 2005. ISBN 0-08-044642-6
- Yvon-Durocher, Gabriel; Caffrey, Jane M.; Cescatti, Alessandro; Dossena, Matteo; Giorgio, Paul del; Gasol, Josep M.; Montoya, José M.; Pumpanen, Jukka; Staehr, Peter A. (2012-06-20). "Reconciling the temperature dependence of respiration across timescales and ecosystem types". Nature. 487 (7408): 472–476. doi:10.1038/nature11205. ISSN 0028-0836
