= Robert Stevenson Thomson =

British physician

Prof Robert Stevenson Thomson FRSE FFPSG (1858–1905) was a 19th-century British physician.

== Life ==
He was born in Southampton to Scots parents. His father was a civil engineer and Robert's name appears a homage to the engineer Robert Stevenson. The family spent much time in St. Petersburg in Russia during his early years. Here he learnt both German and Russian before returning to Britain to his father's home town of Glasgow. Robert was then educated at Glasgow Academy before studying medicine at Glasgow University gaining a general degree first (1880) before qualifying MB CM in 1882. He had practical experience at Glasgow Western Infirmary before becoming Resident Physician at the Belvidere Fever Hospital. He then undertook a year's postgraduate study in Vienna before returning to Glasgow as House physician under Dr James Finlayson.

In 1887/8 he transferred to the City Smallpox Hospital and remained there until death. He also began assisting Prof Samson Gemmell teaching at the Anderson College. When Gemmell went to Glasgow University as Professor of Clinical Medicine in 1899, Thomson replaced him at the Anderson College as Professor of Systematic Medicine.

He received his doctorate (MD) in 1897 and received the Bellahouston gold medal for his thesis.

In 1900 he was living at 3 Melrose Street in Glasgow: a three-storey and basement 19th century terraced townhouse.

In 1901 Glasgow University gave him a second doctorate (DSc).

He was elected a Fellow of the Royal Society of Edinburgh in 1902. His proposers were John Gray McKendrick, Magnus Maclean, John Souttar McKendrick and Andrew Freeland Fergus.

By 1904 he was living at 12 Blythswood Square in central Glasgow.

He died in February 1905 probably of smallpox or a smallpox related disease.

== Family ==
He was married but had no children.
