= John Macintyre =

Scottish doctor (1857–1928)

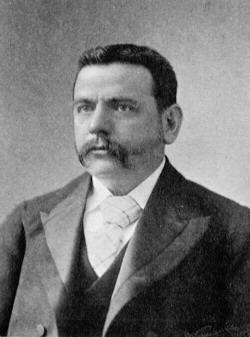
- John Macintyre
- Born: 2 October 1857; Glasgow, Scotland
- Died: 29 October 1928 (aged 71)
- Education: University of Glasgow
- Known for: Establishing the world's first radiology department
- Spouse: Agnes Jean Hardie (m. 1892)

Dr. Macintyre's X-Ray Film

John Macintyre or Mcintyre FRSE (2 October 1857 – 29 October 1928) was a Scottish medical doctor who set up the world's first radiology department at the Glasgow Royal Infirmary, in Glasgow.

== Life ==
Macintyre was born in High Street, Glasgow. His father was a tailor. His mother was related to the missionary and explorer David Livingstone. Macintyre originally trained as an electrical engineer and worked as an apprentice electrician before enrolling to the University of Glasgow in 1878. There he changed his field for medicine and graduated in 1882 with the Bachelor of Medicine degree. He then worked as a naval surgeon in London, Paris and Vienna, and returned to Glasgow to assume a position of a Surgeon for Diseases of the Throat at Anderson's College Dispensary. He later established a private practice specialising in the treatment of singers and actors.

As part of his interest in the larynx, he was responsible for creating the first self-illuminated endoscope around 1894/5.

Macintyre is mostly known for applying his electrical engineering knowledge to medicine. In 1885 he became Consulting Medical Electrician at Glasgow Royal Infirmary where he established a "department for the application of medical electricity" in 1887. In 1893 he became President of the British Laryngological Society. In 1895 he was elected a Fellow of the Royal Society of Edinburgh. His proposers were John Gray McKendrick, James Thomson Bottomley, Magnus Maclean and William Jack.

Late in 1895, X-rays were discovered by Wilhelm Röntgen. On 5 February 1896 James Thomson Bottomley asked McIntyre to demonstrate an x-ray machine created by his uncle, William Thomson, Lord Kelvin following instructions from Rontgen (Lord Kelvin was ill and could not attend). The demonstration took place at Glasgow Royal Infirmary and was the first use of x-rays in Scotland. All Scottish hospitals introduced x-ray machines within the next 12 months.

Macintyre went further and recorded an X-ray movie of the moving legs of a frog, and presented the results in a report "On Roentgen X-Rays, or the new photography" to the Philosophical Society of Glasgow in 1896. In the same year, he set up the world's first radiology department at the Glasgow Royal Infirmary, where X-ray photographs were used in the diagnosis and treatment of patients. There, Macintyre produced the first images of renal stones and various inner body parts. For his groundbreaking work, he received many awards and honours.

In 1897 he moved to London and was an early member of the Rontgen Society of London. He later served as president.

He was also President of the West of Scotland Branch of the British Medical Association, Corresponding Fellow of the American and French Laryngological Associations, Fellow of the Royal Society of Edinburgh and of the Royal Microscopical Society, among other posts.

He died on 29 October 1928.

== Family ==
In 1892 he married Agnes Jean Hardie.
