= Robert Patrick Wright =

Sir Robert Patrick Wright JP FRSE FRAS (1857–1938) was a Scottish farmer and agriculturalist. He was Chairman of the Scottish Board of Agriculture and was knighted by King George V on 6 July 1911.

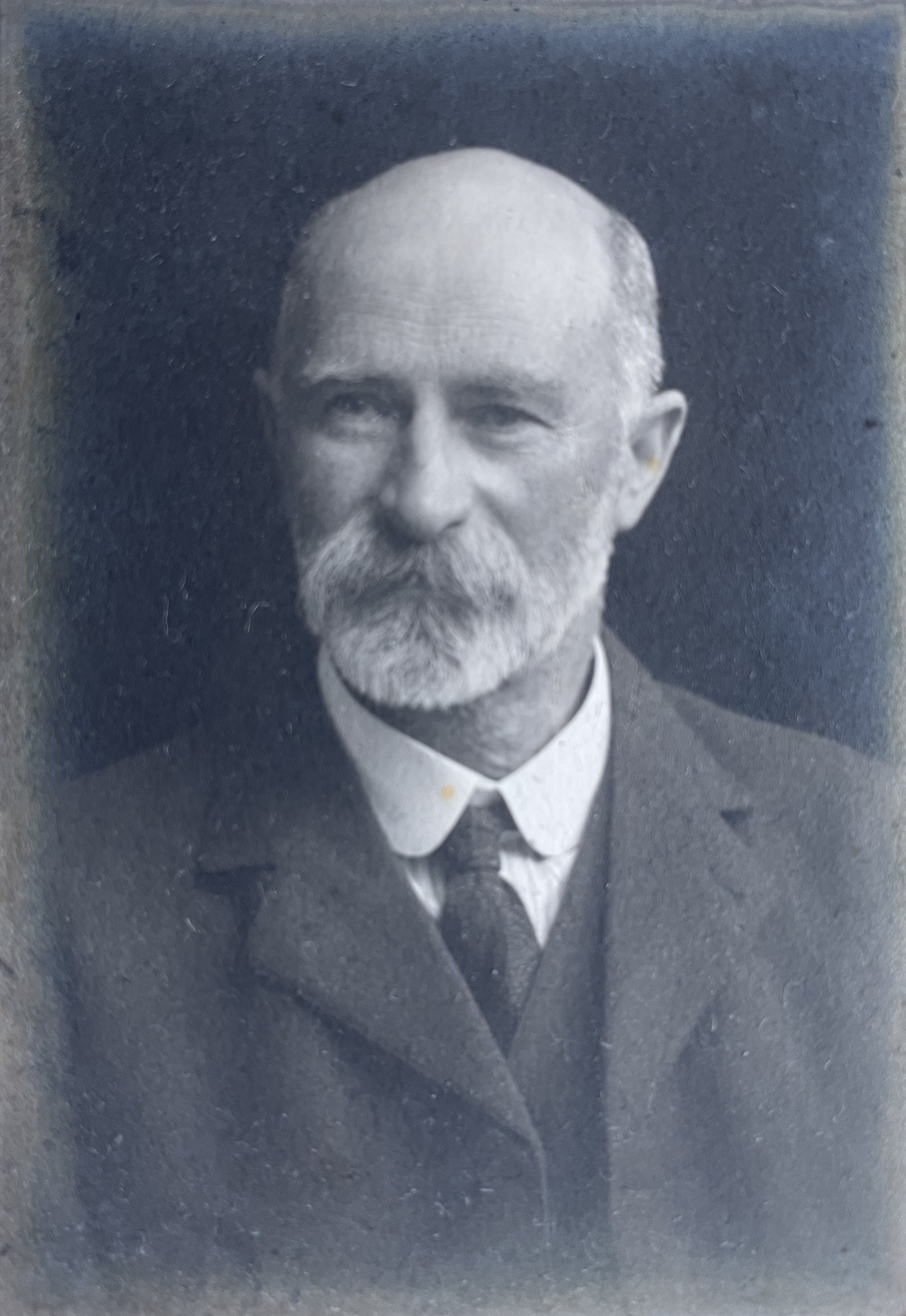
Sir Robert Patrick Wright

== Life ==
He was born on 12 February 1857 the son of Robert Wright, a tenant farmer of Downan Farm near Ballantrae in Ayrshire, one of eight siblings. He was educated at Ayr Academy, then undertook formal training at the University of Edinburgh under Prof John Wilson. He took up farming but abandoned it due to his views on land tenure, and instead focussed on Scottish land reforms and improvements for tenant farmers.

He became Professor of Agriculture at the West of Scotland Technical College around 1890. In 1896 he was elected a Fellow of the Royal Society of Edinburgh. His proposers were Andrew Peebles Aitken, John Gray McKendrick, Magnus Maclean and William Jack.

In 1910 he was living at "Maraval", a villa in Uddingston.

He became Sir Robert Patrick Wright when knighted by King George V on 6 July 1911 at St James's Palace, London (the honour took effect from 20 June 1911).

He died at the Heugh Farmhouse in North Berwick on 19 December 1938. He is buried with his parents at Ballantrae.

== Publications ==
- The Standard Cyclopaedia of Modern Agriculture
- Principles of Agriculture
- The Improvement of Poor Permanent Pasture

== Family ==
In 1902 he married Marion Miller from Orkney. Their first son, William James Wright (b.1903, d.1994), was appointed Commander of the British Empire (CBE) by Queen Elizabeth II in the 1955 New Year Honours.
