= Alexander Veitch Lothian =

Scottish mathematician and geologist

Alexander Veitch Lothian FRSE (c. 1850 – 1933) was a Scottish mathematician and geologist.

== Life ==
His early life is unclear, but Lothian was operational as a teacher from at least the 1870s and acted as Interim Headmaster of Girvan Burgh School in 1879. He studied as a mature student at Glasgow University graduating MA in 1882. He taught Maths and Science at Aberdeen Grammar School from 1881 to 1890. From 1891 to 1897 he lectured in Maths and Science at the E C Training College, and from 1897 was the Baxter Demonstrator in Geology at Glasgow University.

In 1898 he was elected a Fellow of the Royal Society of Edinburgh. His proposers were Magnus Maclean, A J Gunion Barclay, John Gray McKendrick and David Fraser Harris.

In 1911 he was living at Glendoane in the Bearsden district of Glasgow.

He died on 30 November 1933.
