= Andrew Freeland Fergus =

Scottish ophthalmic surgeon

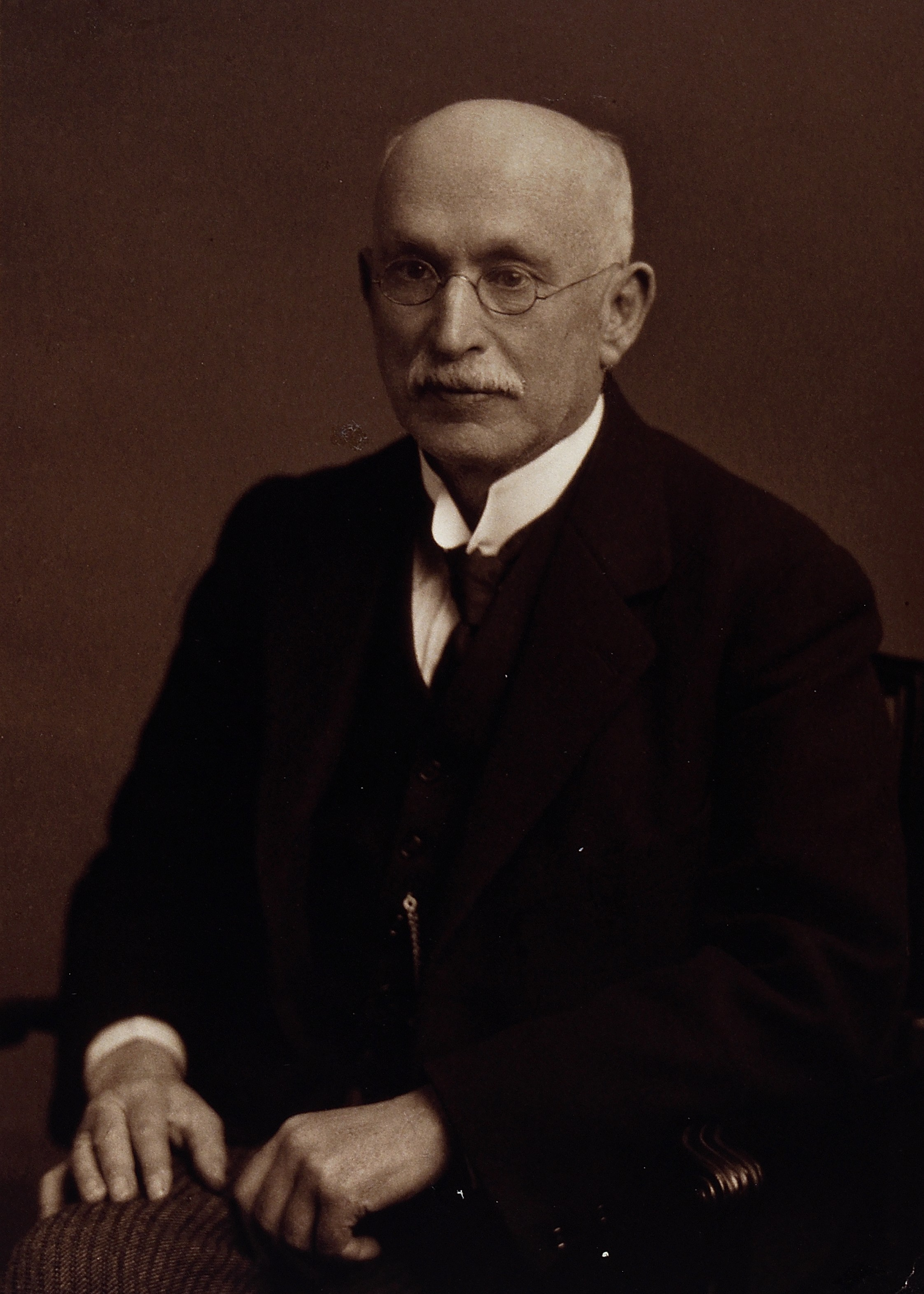
Andrew Freeland Fergus

Dr Andrew Freeland Fergus FRSE LLD (1858–1932) was a Scottish ophthalmic surgeon. He was President of the Royal College of Surgeons in Glasgow, President of the Chirurgical Society, President of the Royal Philosophical Society of Glasgow, and President of the Greenock Faculty of Medicine.

== Life ==
He was born in Glasgow the son of Dr Andrew Fergus (1822–1887) a surgeon living at 306 St Vincent Street and his wife Margaret Naismith. His younger brother was the poet/surgeon John Freeland Fergus (1865–1943). His nephew was Andrew Fergus Hewat FRSE. He studied at Glasgow University then did further studies in Europe at the University of Utrecht and Paris. He then received a role as surgeon at the Glasgow Eye Hospital in 1882.

In 1899 he was elected a Fellow of the Royal Society of Edinburgh. His proposers were William Thomson, Lord Kelvin, John Gray McKendrick, James Thomson Bottomley and Magnus Maclean. From 1909 to 1915 he was Professor of Ophthalmic Medicine and Surgery at the Anderson College in Glasgow.

In the First World War he served as a Major in the 4th Scottish General Hospital at Stobhill and was Mentioned in Dispatches.

He died on 24 October 1932.

== Publications ==
- On the Operative Treatment of Stabismus (1900)
- The Origin and Development of the Glasgow School of Medicine (1901)
- Elementary Ophthalmic Optics (1903)
- Sketch of the Life of William Mackenzie MD (1917)
