= Robert Blyth Greig =

Scottish agriculturalist

Sir Robert Blyth Greig MC FRSE (23 March 1874 – 29 November 1947) was a Scottish agriculturalist. He served as cchairman of the Board of Agriculture for Scotland from 1921 to 1928 and was secretary to the Department of Agriculture for all Great Britain from 1928 to 1934.

== Early life ==
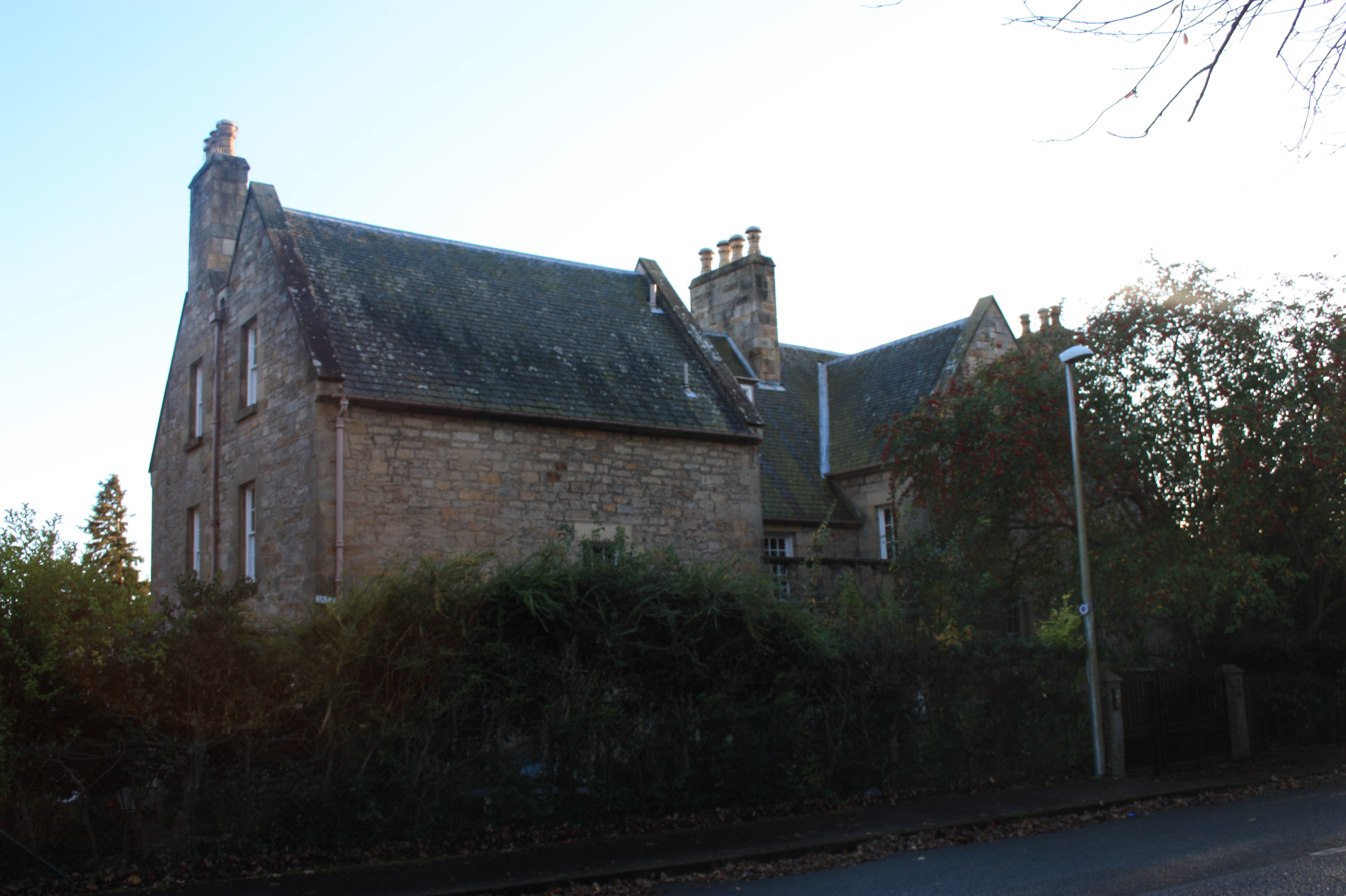
The Shaws, 10 Barnton Avenue West, Edinburgh

Robert Blyth Greig was born on 23 March 1874 in Balcurvie, Fife, the son of Helen Ann Martin and George Greig, a farmer.

== Education ==
He studied at the University of Edinburgh and began lecturing at Marischal College at the University of Aberdeen in 1903 and continued here until 1910 (being succeeded by John Morrison Caie). During this period he lived at "The Croft" in Cults, a small village west of the city of Aberdeen.

== Career ==
In 1905, he was elected a Fellow of the Royal Society of Edinburgh. His proposers were Sir John Arthur Thomson, David James Hamilton, Robert Patrick Wright and Douglas Alston Gilchrist. He served as vice president of the society from 1924 to 1927. He served as a commissioner on the Scottish Board of Agriculture from 1912. In 1921, he succeeded Sir Robert Wright as chairman.

In the First World War he served as a staff captain in the Royal Scots and saw action in France in 1916 and 1917, being awarded an MC in the 1917 New Year Honours. He was created a Knight Bachelor in the 1919 New Year Honours. He received honorary doctorates from St Andrews University (LLD) and South Africa (DSc).

In 1937, he was appointed a director of the London, Midland and Scottish Railway Company. He was also a director of the Dundalk, Newry and Greenore Railway Company, and the Scottish Motor Traction Company.

In later life, he lived at "The Shaws" (10) Barton Avenue West in western Edinburgh. The house is a large detached Arts and Crafts villa set in substantial gardens, and is now a category B listed building.

== Death ==
Greig died on 29 November 1947, aged 73.

== Recognition ==
A photographic portrait of Greig by Alexander Bassano is held by the National Portrait Gallery in London.

== Family ==
In 1903, he married Alice Maud Hunter. They had four children: George Marcus Greig (b.1904); Marion Greig (b.1906); and Robert Coventry Greig (b.1909) and John Martin Greig (b.1920)
