= HSMM =

HSMM is an acronym that can have multiple meanings:

- Hidden semi-Markov model, a statistical model.
- High Speed Multimedia, an amateur radio project using 802.11 wireless networking hardware.
