= Anderson Gray McKendrick =

Scottish military physician and epidemiologist (1876–1943)

- Born: 8 September 1876; Edinburgh, Scotland
- Died: 30 May 1943 (aged 66); Carrbridge, Scotland
- Education: University of Glasgow (MB ChB)
- Known for: Kermack-McKendrick theory; McKendrick-von Foerster equation
- Awards: Fellow of the Royal Society of Edinburgh (1912); Fellow of the Royal College of Physicians of Edinburgh (1924)
- Scientific career
- Fields: Epidemiology
- Workplaces: Indian Medical Service; Pasteur Institute of India; Royal College of Physicians of Edinburgh

Anderson Gray McKendrick DSc FRSE (8 September 1876 – 30 May 1943) was a Scottish military physician and epidemiologist who pioneered the use of mathematical methods in epidemiology. Irwin (see below) commented on the quality of his work, "Although an amateur, he was a brilliant mathematician, with a far greater insight than many professionals."

== Biography ==
McKendrick was born on 8 September 1876, in Edinburgh, the fifth and last child of John Gray McKendrick FRS, a distinguished physiologist, and his wife, Mary Souttar. His older brother was John Souttar McKendrick FRSE (1874–1946).

He was educated at Kelvinside Academy then trained as a doctor at the University of Glasgow qualifying MB ChB in 1900. He then was commissioned in the British Army and joined the Indian Medical Service. At the rank of Lt Colonel he led an expedition into Somaliland in 1903/4 as part of what was then known as the Dervish Wars.

He later worked with Ronald Ross and eventually would continue his work on mathematical epidemiology. His primary interest was in research and he was director of the Pasteur Institute at Kasauli in the Punjab 1914–1920. He was invalided home to Britain in 1920 and settled in Edinburgh where he became Superintendent of the Laboratory of the Royal College of Physicians of Edinburgh. He held this post for the rest of his life.

McKendrick's career as a mathematical epidemiologist began in India. In 1911, McKendrick rediscovered the logistic equation and fit it to bacterial growth data. In 1912, he was elected a Fellow of the Royal Society of Edinburgh. His proposers were James Oliver, Diarmid Noel Paton, Ralph Stockman and Cargill Gilston Knott. He served as the Society's Vice President 1933–36. In 1933, he was elected a member of the Aesculapian Club.

In 1914, he published a paper in which he gave equations for the pure birth process and a particular birth–death process. In 1924, he was elected a Fellow of the Royal College of Physicians of Edinburgh. After his return to Scotland he published more. His 1926 paper, 'Applications of mathematics to medical problems' was particularly impressive, including the widely used McKendrick–Von Foerster partial differential equation.

Some of this paper's other results for stochastic models of epidemics and population growth were rediscovered by William Feller in 1939. Feller remarks in his An Introduction to Probability Theory and Its Applications (3rd edition p. 450), "It is unfortunate that this remarkable paper passed practically unnoticed." In 1927, McKendrick began a collaboration with William Ogilvy Kermack (1898–1970) which produced a notable series of papers on the Kermack–McKendrick theory, a general theory of infectious disease transmission.

He died on 30 May 1943, aged 68, in Carrbridge.

== Selected works ==
- A. G. McKendrick Applications of mathematics to medical problems Kapil Proceedings of the Edinburgh Mathematical Society, vol 44, (1925–6), pp. 1–34. Reprinted with commentary in S. Kotz & N. L. Johnson (Editors) (1997) Breakthroughs in Statistics: Volume III New York Springer.
- W. O. Kermack; A. G. McKendrick “A Contribution to the Mathematical Theory of Epidemics,” Proceedings of the Royal Society of London. Series A, Vol. 115, (1927), pp. 700–721.
- W. O. Kermack; A. G. McKendrick “Contributions to the Mathematical Theory of Epidemics. II. The Problem of Endemicity,” Proceedings of the Royal Society of London. Series A, Vol. 138, (1932) pp. 55–83.
- W. O. Kermack; A. G. McKendrick “Contributions to the Mathematical Theory of Epidemics. III. Further Studies of the Problem of Endemicity,” Proceedings of the Royal Society of London. Series A, Vol. 141, (1933), pp. 94–122.

== Biography ==
- Warren M. Hirsch (2004) McKendrick, Anderson Gray (1876–1943), Oxford Dictionary of National Biography, Oxford University Press.
- Gani, J. (2001) Anderson Gray McKendrick, Statisticians of the Centuries (ed. C. C. Heyde and E. Seneta) pp. 323–327. New York: Springer.
