= Leonard Findlay =

Scottish physician (1878–1947)

Professor Leonard Findlay
- Leonard Findlay sitting smoking a cigar
- Born: 5 February 1878; Glasgow, Ayrshire
- Died: 14 June 1947 (aged 69)
- Education: University of Glasgow
- Known for: Leonard Gow Lecturer on the Medical Diseases of Infancy and Childhood, Samson Gemmell Chair of Child Health

Leonard Findlay (5 February 1878, in Glasgow – 14 June 1947) was the paediatrician who was the first Leonard Gow Lecturer on the Medical Diseases of Infancy and Childhood. Findlay was also the first person to hold the Samson Gemmell Chair of Child Health at the University of Glasgow.

Findlay married Gertrude Findlay née Binning in 1905. The couple had two daughters.

== Life ==
Findlay was the son of a doctor, Dr William Findlay who was also an essayist who wrote under the pen name, George Umber. His mother was Margaret Findlay née Carruthers. Findlay took his early education at Allan Glen's School before moving to Glasgow University. He graduated Bachelor of Medicine, Bachelor of Surgery in 1900 and Doctor of Medicine in 1904 both with commendations. Findlay passed the DSc in 1912.

== Career ==
Findlay's first post was at the outpatient's department of Western Infirmary in Glasgow before moving to the Department of Pathology under Sir Robert Muir. After several years gaining experience in Pathology, Findlay became an assistant to Samson Gemmell. During this period he became interested in rickets in children, which later led to an interest in infant malnutrition, that lead to paediatrics. The interest in rickets resulted in Findlay to visit Germany for post-graduate study, to work with Heinrich Finkelstein in Berlin.

After returning to Glasgow in 1902, Findlay worked at the outpatient's department at the Royal Hospital for Sick Children, Glasgow, as well as the dispensary. In 1914, he was appointed a Visiting Physician at the new site of the Royal hospital in Yorkhill in Glasgow. In 1915, the hospital was requisitioned by the military, with Findlay being assigned the rank of captain, looking after military medical cases during World War I. In 1918, Findlay was posted to France for military duty. In 1919, Findlay planned to return to Glasgow but instead was appointed to become Director of child welfare of the International Federation of Red Cross and Red Crescent Societies in Geneva. In late 1919 after returning to Glasgow, Findlay was appointed the Leonard Gow lecturer in Medical Diseases of Infancy and Childhood (paediatrics), updating to curriculum of the University of Glasgow Medical School to teach paediatrics. In 1924, Findlay became the first Samson Gemmell Chair of Child Health.

Findlay finally left Glasgow University and resigned in 1930, settling in London. Findlay opened a clinic in Wimpole Street in Marylebone and at the same time was appointed as a physician at the Queen Elizabeth Hospital for Children. During this period he taught a number of younger doctors during the interwar period. At the start of World War II, Findlay worked as a doctor at Children's Department of the Radcliffe Infirmary, Oxford.

== Work ==
In the first decade of the 20th century, two physicians at Glasgow University, took up the study of rickets. These physicians were Professor of Physiology Noel Paton and Leonard Findlay. After experimenting on puppies, both Findlay and Paton believed that the underlying cause of rickets was a lack of sunlight, exercise and fresh air. This was a view that was against the prevailing idea at the time, that the disease was caused by a toxin. They believed that sufficient sunlight, exercise and fresh air would halt the symptoms of Rickets, particularly in overcrowded industrial cities like Glasgow.

When Findlay reported on the aetiology of rickets in 1908, he reached the following conclusion:

The confinement of children, which we find wherever rickets prevails, does, of course, deprive them of some fresh air and sunshine and thus reduce their restive power, but it is not entirely... on these grounds that it exerts a baneful influence. It is due to the want on exercise which invariably goes along with ... the confinement. We may surmise that lack of exercise fresh air... allows the generation of some harmful product, and so by autointoxication brings about the disease.

In the second decade of the 20th century Findlay again collaborated with his colleague Diarmid-Noel Paton to study Tetany. Findlay and Paton isolated a Guanidine compound.
