= William James Wright =

Scottish farmer and agriculturalist (1903–1994)

William James Wright CBE JP (1903–1994) was a Scottish farmer and agriculturalist. He was appointed Commander of the British Empire (CBE) by Queen Elizabeth II in the 1955 New Year Honours for Services to Agriculture in Scotland.

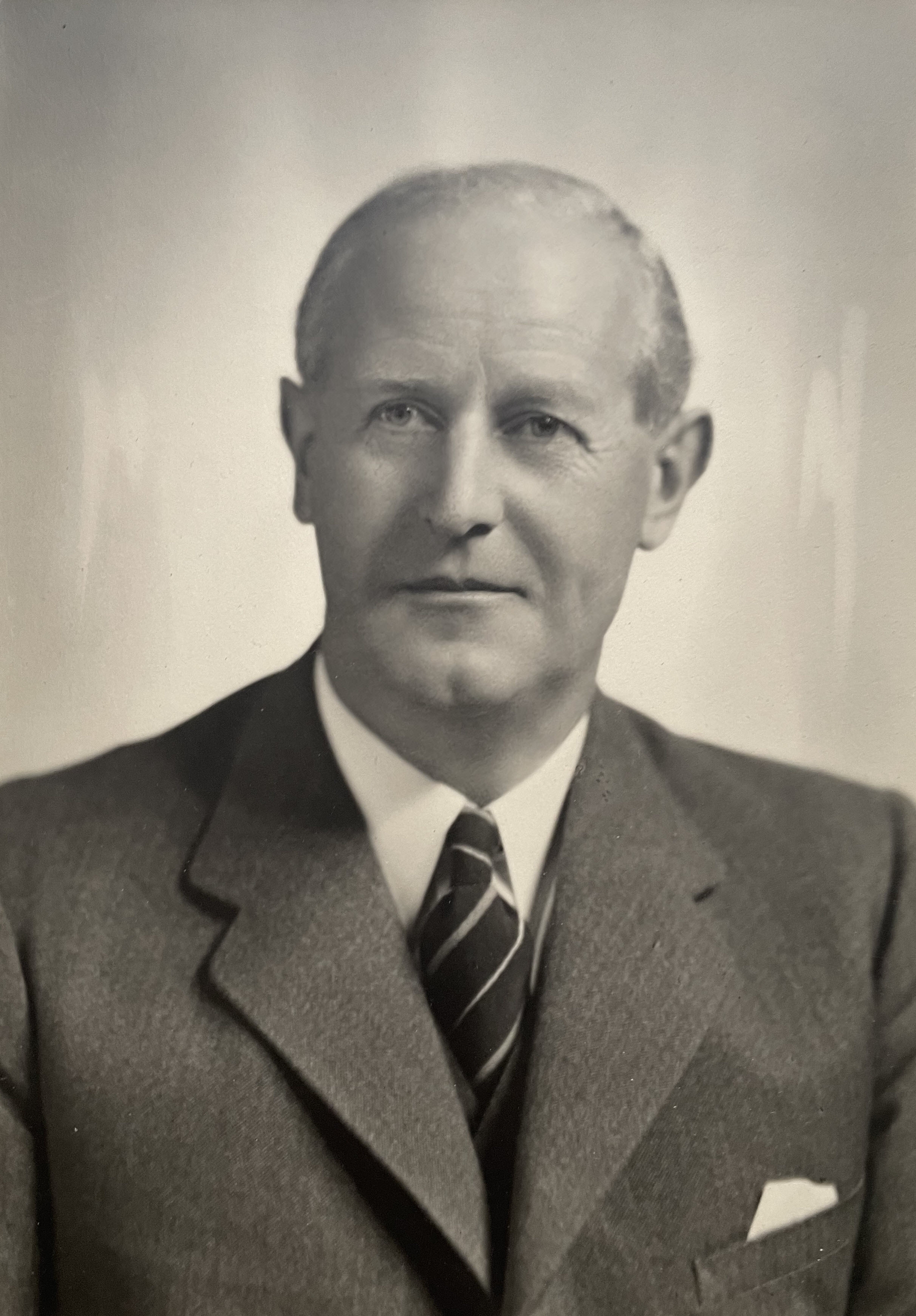
William James Wright CBE

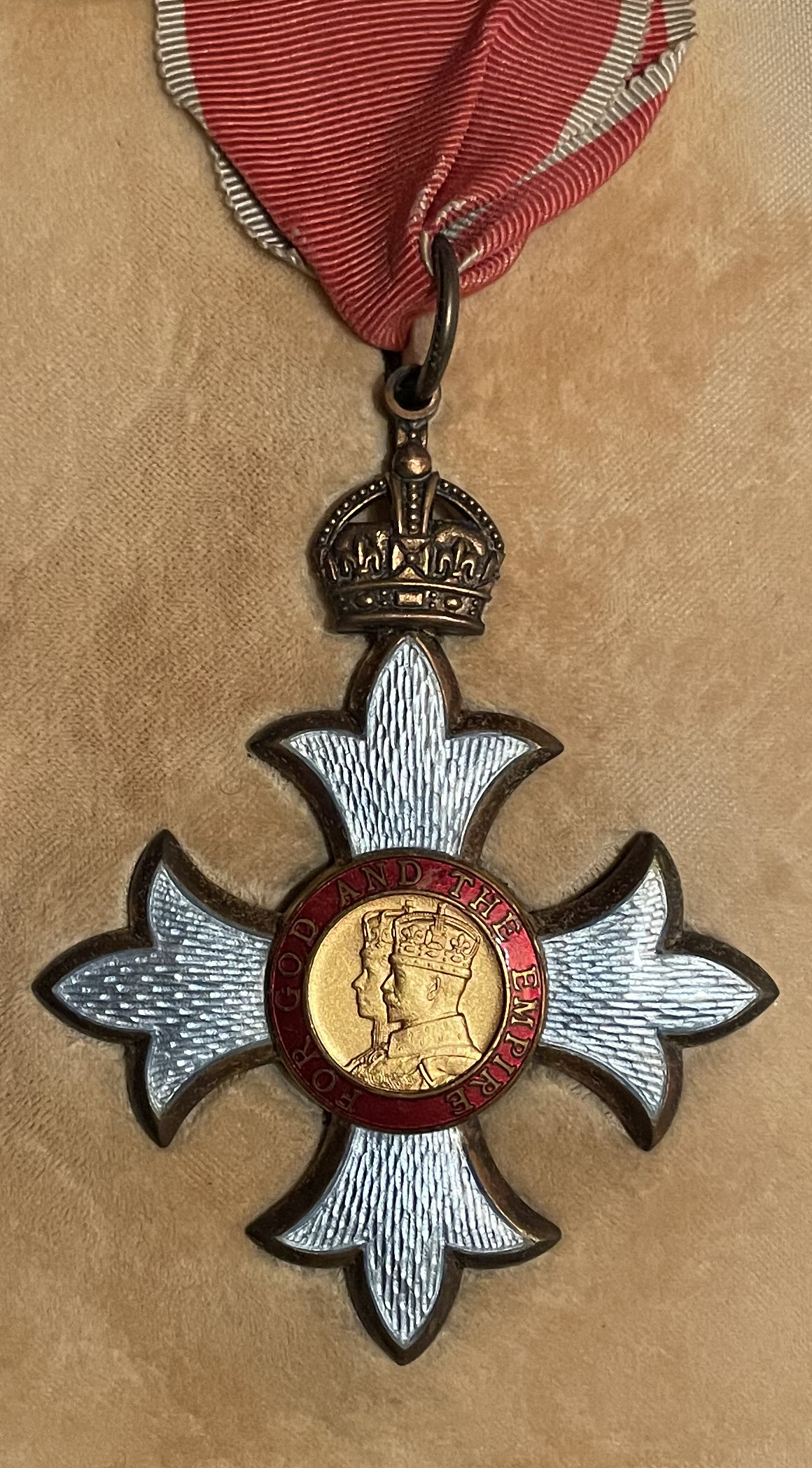
William James Wright's CBE

== Life ==
William James Wright was born on 26 March 1903 in Scotstoun, Glasgow, the eldest son of Sir Robert Patrick Wright who was the first chairman of the Board (since Department) of Agriculture for Scotland.

He was educated at Edinburgh Academy and then went on to study agriculture at University College of Wales (1923 to 1926).

He farmed "The Heugh", later renamed "Bass Rock", farm near North Berwick in East Lothian for 50 years (1926–1976) in partnership with his brother David. Their dairy and poultry farm comprised some 186 acres, plus 90 acres of adjoining grazing on North Berwick Law. As a member of the BBC's Farm Forum panel his voice became familiar to many thousands of radio listeners. Prior to retiring from farming he donated a Allis-Chalmers combine harvester and other agricultural and poultry equipment to the Society of Antiquaries of Scotland.

He was a member of the Abbey Church in North Berwick, serving as an Elder from 1934 and Session Clerk from 1946. A William Wright Memorial Fund was set up to benefit the Abbey Church in general, the Young Church and the Guild.

He died in Trinity, Edinburgh in 1994.

== Appointments ==
1934: Member, Scottish Agricultural Advisory Council.

1935: Chairman, East of Scotland Milk Producers' Federation.

1937-1938: President, Chamber of Agriculture for Scotland.

1938: Employers' Representative, Milk Distributive Trade Board for Scotland.

1939: Employers' Representative, Scottish Agricultural Wages Board.

1939-1940: President, National Farmers' Union of Scotland and Chamber of Agriculture for Scotland.

1943-1968: Member, Scottish Milk Marketing Board.

1945-1949: Member, Agricultural Research Council.

1947: Appointed by the Secretary of State for Scotland, chairman, Supervisory Committee on Artificial Insemination of Live Stock.

1949: Member, Committee on Exports and Imports of Cattle Semen.

1949-1964: Appointed by Royal Warrant, Member, Development Commission.

1951: Appointed Justice of the Peace for East Lothian.

1952: Chairman, Scottish Advisory Committee on Artificial Insemination.

1952: Elected Member, Licensing Appeal Court for East Lothian.

1955: Elected Vice-chairman, Scottish Milk Publicity Council.

1955: Appointed Commander of the British Empire (CBE) by Queen Elizabeth II in the 1955 New Year Honours for services to agriculture in Scotland.

1962-1968: Vice-chairman, Scottish Milk Marketing Board.

== Family ==
He married Annie Euronwy Hughes, who he met while studying in Aberystwyth, Wales, and had four children; Robert, Elizabeth, Heather and Gwendoline.
