= Von Foerster equation =

The McKendrick–von Foerster equation is a linear first-order partial differential equation encountered in several areas of mathematical biology – for example, demography and cell proliferation modeling; it is applied when age structure is an important feature in the mathematical model. It was first presented by Anderson Gray McKendrick in 1926 as a deterministic limit of lattice models applied to epidemiology, and subsequently independently in 1959 by biophysics professor Heinz von Foerster for describing cell cycles.

== Mathematical formula ==
The mathematical formula can be derived from first principles. It reads:

$\frac{\partial n}{\partial t} + \frac{\partial n}{\partial a} = - m(a)n$

where the population density $n(t,a)$ is a function of age $a$ and time $t$, and $m(a)$ is the death function. When $m(a) = 0$, we have:

$$\frac{\partial n}{\partial t} = - \frac{\partial n}{\partial a}$$

It relates that a population ages, and that fact is the only one that influences change in population density; the negative sign shows that time flows in just one direction, that there is no birth and the population is going to die out.

=== Derivation ===
Suppose that for a change in time $dt$ and change in age $da$, the population density is:
$$n(t+dt,a + da) = [1-m(a)dt]n(t,a)$$
That is, during a time period $dt$ the population density decreases by a percentage $m(a)dt$. Taking a Taylor series expansion to order $dt$ gives us that:
$$n(t+dt,a + da) \approx n(t,a) + {\partial n\over{\partial t}}dt + {\partial n\over{\partial a}}da$$
We know that $da/dt = 1$, since the change of age with time is 1. Therefore, after collecting terms, we must have that:
$${\partial n\over{\partial t}} + {\partial n\over{\partial a}} = -m(a)n$$

== Analytical solution ==
The von Foerster equation is a continuity equation; it can be solved using the method of characteristics. Another way is by similarity solution; and a third is a numerical approach such as finite differences.

To get the solution, the following boundary conditions should be added:

$$n(t,0)= \int_0^\infty b (a)n(t,a) \, da$$

which states that the initial births should be conserved (see Sharpe–Lotka–McKendrick equation for otherwise), and that:

$$n(0,a)= f(a)$$

which states that the initial population must be given; then it will evolve according to the partial differential equation.

== Similar equations ==
In Sebastian Aniţa, Viorel Arnăutu, Vincenzo Capasso. An Introduction to Optimal Control Problems in Life Sciences and Economics (Birkhäuser. 2011), this equation appears as a special case of the Sharpe–Lotka–McKendrick’s equation; in the latter there is inflow, and the math is based on directional derivative. The McKendrick’s equation appears extensively in the context of cell biology as a good approach to model the eukaryotic cell cycle.

== See also ==
- Finite difference method
- Partial differential equation
- Renewal theory
- Continuity equation
- Volterra integral equation
