= Samson Gemmell =

Scottish pediatrician

- Born: 1848; Catrine, Ayrshire
- Died: 2 April 1913 (aged 65)
- Education: University of Glasgow
- Known for: Regius Professor of Practice of Medicine at the University of Glasgow

Samson Gemmell FRFPS (1848 – 2 April 1913) was a Scottish paediatrician who became Regius Professor of Practice of Medicine at the University of Glasgow.

== Life ==
Gemmell was born in Catrine in 1848 and was educated at Glasgow High School. He applied to the University of Glasgow to study art, with a goal of joining the Civil Service, but a childhood deformity precluded this career move, and forced Gemmell to switch career to Medicine, graduating in 1872 with a Medicine (M.B.) and Surgery (C.M.) qualification with Honours.

Gemmell never married.

== Career ==
Gemmell had a number of junior positions before becoming a physician. His first role was working for one year as a resident assistant to Sir William Tennant Gairdner at the Glasgow Royal Infirmary. From 1874 to 1877 Gemmell worked as Physician assistant to Dr JB Russell at the Glasgow Fever Hospital. Gemmell then became a demonstrator of Anatomy for the anatomist Allen Thomson. In 1887 Gemmell was appointed as a physician to the Glasgow Royal Infirmary. In 1892 he was appointed to the same position at the Western Infirmary.

In 1880, Gemmell became a Doctor of Medicine (MD) and was appointed as Professor to the Chair of Systematic Medicine at the Anderson's College Medical School. In 1908 Gemmell was appointed to Regius Professor of Medicine, a position he held until 1913. Gemmell was assisted in this role by Robert Stevenson Thomson. In 1888-1899 Gemmel became Professor of Clinical Medicine at Glasgow University and his position as Professor at Anderson's College was filled by Thomson.

Gemmell died on 2 April 1913, possibly from a heart attack.

== Chair ==
Gemmell had a brother called William Gemmell, who donated bequeathed £20,000 to the university, to be used either in the medical or science faculties. £20,000 was a substantial sum of money at the time, equivalent to £624,980 in August 2018. The money was used to establish the first Chair of Paediatrics in Great Britain. The first occupant in 1924, was Leonard Findlay. The Chair of Paediatrics was renamed in 1947 to the Samson Gemmell Chair of Child Health.
