= Andrew Fergus Hewat =

Scottish physician (1884–1957)

Dr Andrew Fergus Hewat FRSE (1884–3 August 1957) was a Scottish physician involved with mental health. He donated the Fergus Hewat Cup to the Royal College of Physicians of Edinburgh, an annual golf championship. This is played between the Royal College of Physicians and Surgeons of Glasgow, and a combined team from the Royal College of Physicians of Edinburgh and the Royal College of Surgeons of Edinburgh.

== Life ==
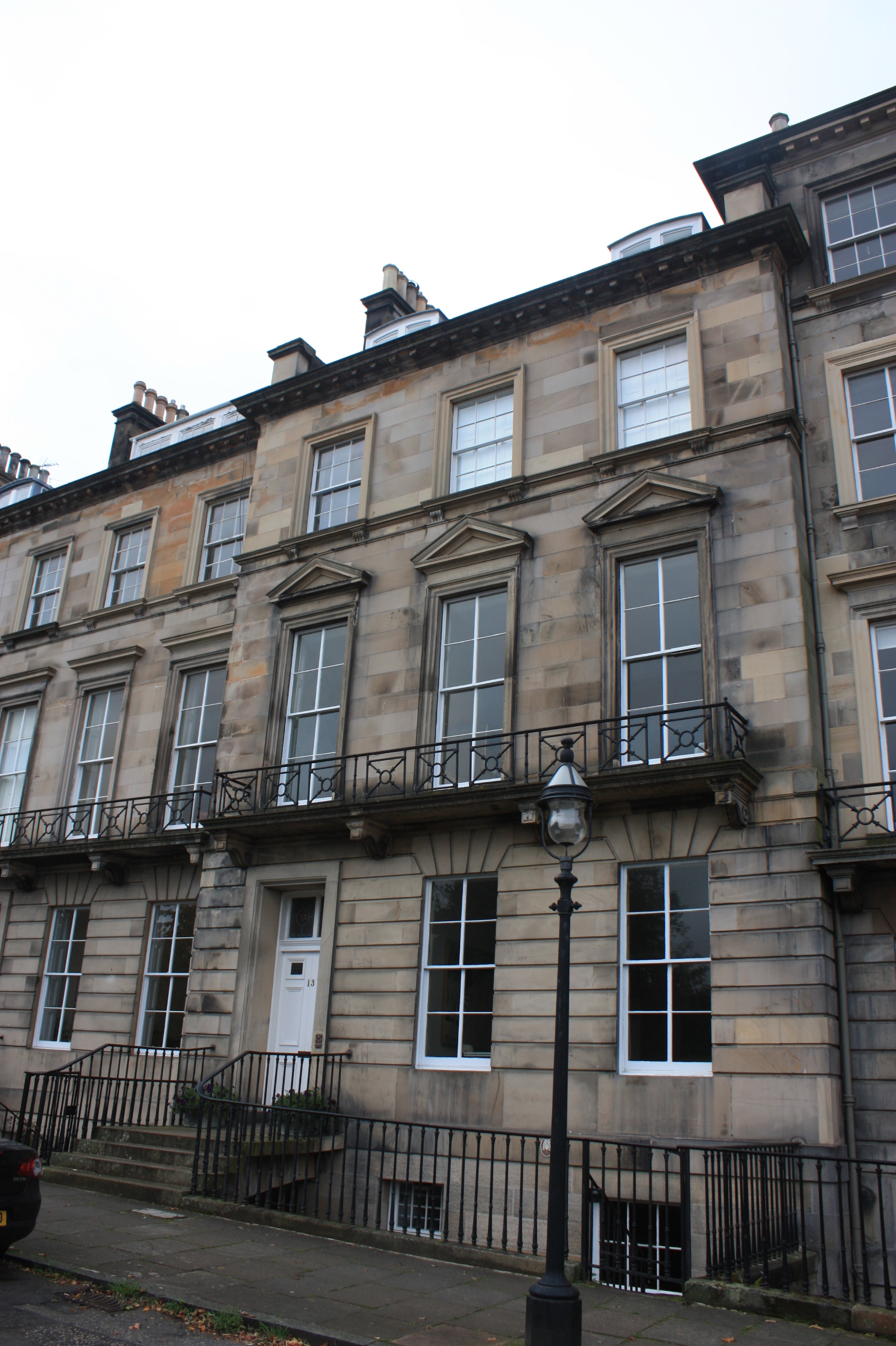
Hewat's home at 13 Eton Terrace, Edinburgh

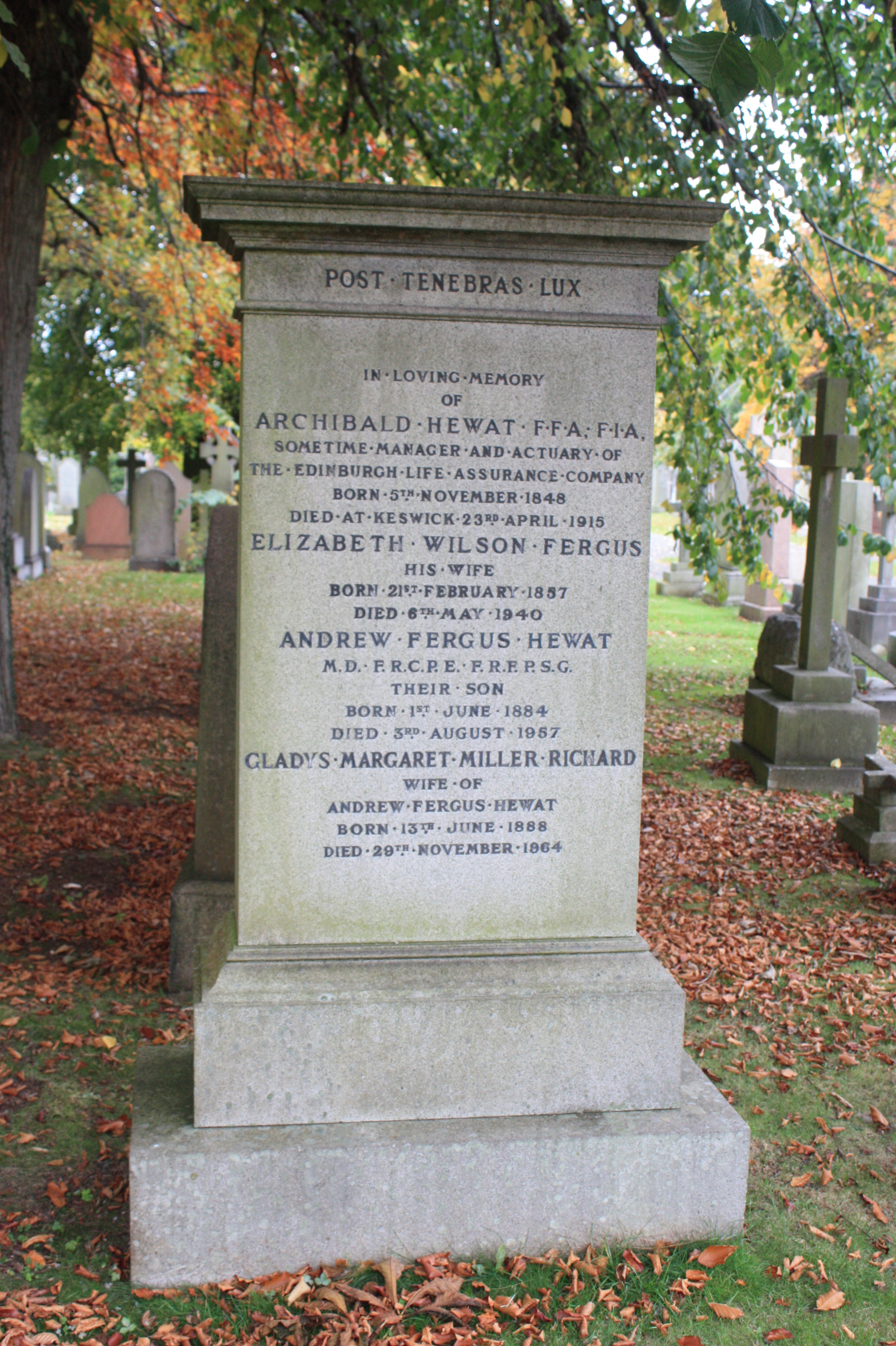
The grave of Andrew Fergus Hewat, Dean Cemetery

He was born in 1884 the son of Elizabeth Wilson Fergus, sister of Andrew Freeland Fergus and John Freeland Fergus, and her husband Archibald Hewat FRSE FFA FIA (1838–1915), a life assurance agent. They lived at 12 Saxe-Coburg Place in Stockbridge, Edinburgh.

He was educated at Edinburgh Academy (1891–1902), just east of his home, and then studied medicine at the University of Edinburgh, gaining an MD in 1925. He became Consultant Physician to the Royal Edinburgh Hospital for Mental and Nervous Disorders in Morningside, Edinburgh. He then lived at 13 Eton Terrace in western Edinburgh, viewing over the Water of Leith valley to the Moray Estate.

In 1921 he was elected a member of the Harveian Society of Edinburgh. In 1936 he was elected a Fellow of the Royal Society of Edinburgh. His proposers were Arthur Logan Turner, Edwin Bramwell, Sir Ernest Wedderburn and John Derg Sutherland. In 1939 he was elected a member of the Aesculapian Club.

He served as President of the Royal College of Physicians of Edinburgh 1943 to 1945 and presented the Fergus Hewat Golf Cup on his retiral from this role. He was also President of the Medico-Chirurgical Society of Edinburgh.

He died on 3 August 1957 and is buried with his parents in Dean Cemetery. The grave lies in the north-west of the Victorian north extension, facing the western path.

== Publications ==
- Examination of the Urine (1921)
- Life Assurance Underwriting (1954)

== Family ==
In 1918 he married Gladys Margaret Richard (1888–1964).
