= Macintyre's X-Ray Film =

- Full film
- Directed by: John Macintyre
- Produced by: John Macintyre
- Release date: 1896
- Running time: 1 min 1 sec
- Country: Scotland
- Language: Silent

Macintyre's X-Ray Film is an 1896 documentary radiography film directed by Scottish medical doctor John Macintyre.

The film shows X-ray images of a frog's knee joint and an X-ray radiograph of an adult's heart and digestive tract (using bismuth as contrast). Each image was captured in 1/300th of a second.

Text from the film's title card reads:

"First XRay Cinematograph ever taken, shown by Dr. Macintyre at the London Royal Society, 1897."

The title card between the footage of images of the heart and stomach reads:

"XRay Photograph of adult, each Picture taken in the 300th part of a second. A series of these enable us to see a complete cycle of the movements of the heart. The movements of the digestive organs can also be seen and the joints of the body thus facilitating diagnosis of diseases of the bones and joints."
