= John Souttar McKendrick =

Scottish physician

Dr John Souttar McKendrick FRSE (1874–1946) was a Scottish physician from the eminent McKendrick family. He served as President of the Royal College of Physicians and Surgeons of Glasgow in 1939.

== Life ==
He was born in 1874 the eldest son of John Gray McKendrick and his wife, Mary Souttar. His younger brother was Anderson Gray McKendrick. He was educated at Kelvinside Academy.

He studied medicine at Glasgow University and graduated MB ChB in 1896.

In the First World War he served at the Bellahouston Red Cross Hospital. He was also assistant physician at the Glasgow Western Infirmary. He lived at 2 Buckingham Terrace in Glasgow at this time. In 1900 he was elected a Fellow of the Royal Society of Edinburgh. His proposers were his father, John Gray McKendrick, Magnus Maclean, Byrom Bramwell and Alexander Buchan.

He died on 31 October 1946. He is buried in Carrbridge Cemetery in northern Scotland.

== Family ==
He was married to Emmeline McKendrick (1881–1959). Their children included Dr John Wellesley McKendrick (1915–1950).

== Publications ==
- Remarks on Jacksonian Epilepsy (1899)
- Epitheliomia of the Oesophagus (1900)
