= Pasteur Institute of India =

Anti Rabies vaccine institute

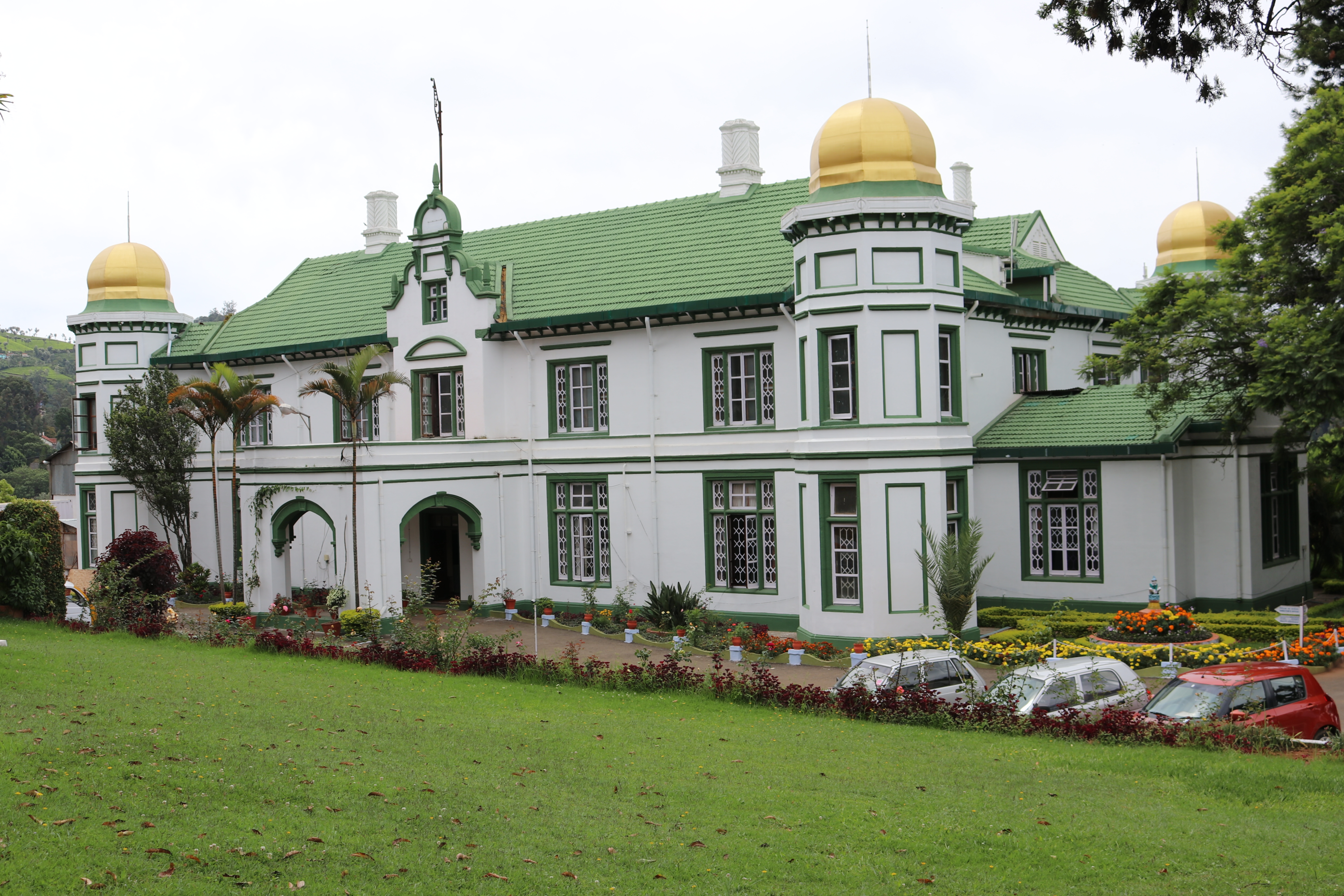
Pasteur Institute of India.

Pasteur Institute of India, Coonoor is one of the pioneer institutes in India in the production of Anti Rabies Vaccine (dog bite vaccine) and DPT vaccine (triple antigen) for the Expanded Programme of Immunization of Government of India. This institute started functioning as Pasteur Institute of Southern India, on 6 April 1907 and was officially opened by H. E. Sir Arthur Lawley, Governor of Madras, on 25 April 1907. The first President of the Society is Surgeon-General W.R. Browne, C.I.E., I.M.S., Surgeon-General with the Government of Madras. The first Honorary Secretary cum Director is Captain J.W. Cornwall, I.M.S., in his remembrance, the road starting from the adjacent area of main gate of the Pasteur Institute of India to Alwarpet named as Cornwall Road. The institute later renamed as Pasteur Institute of India (registered as a society under the Societies Registration Act 1860) and started functioning as an autonomous body under the Ministry of Health and Family Welfare, Government of India, from 10 February 1977. The affairs of the institute are managed by a governing body.

== Genesis ==
The death of a young English lady Lily Pakenham Walsh, due to hydrophobia in the year 1902, who could not get anti-rabies treatment in time, led to the establishment of Pasteur Institute of Southern India. Henry Phipps, American philanthropist donated to Lord Curzon, the then Viceroy of India a sum of Rs.50.00 lakhs for the development of Medical Institutions, out of which, a sum of Rupees one lakh was allocated to start the Pasteur Institute of Southern India at Coonoor. The cool and equitable climate led to the choice of Coonoor as the most suitable location for the construction of the institute. Spread over an area of 16 acres of land the institute is situated on a grassy knoll on the upper reaches of Coonoor town amidst beautiful surroundings with lush greenery, manicured lawns and flower gardens. It has a glorious tradition of single minded dedication to alleviate the suffering of humanity by its contribution to the research and development of vaccines in the country.

== Functions ==
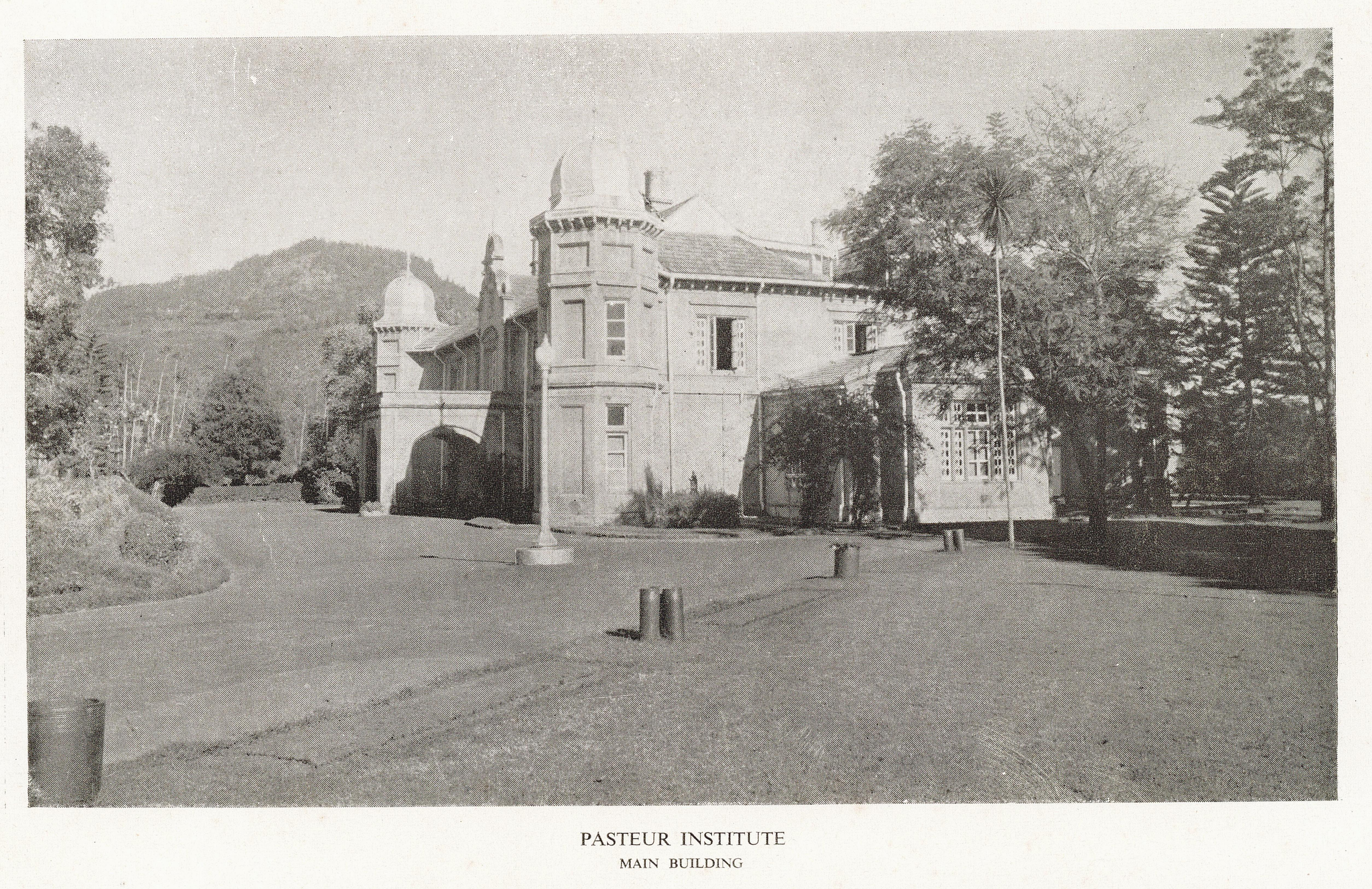
Main Building of Pasteur Institute of India taken during Golden Jubilee

Pasteur Institute of India, Coonoor is producing Vero Cell Derived Rabies Vaccine for Human use and DPT group vaccines consisting

(i) DPT Vaccine
(ii) DT Vaccine and
(iii) TT Vaccine supplying to Universal Immunization Programme (UIP).

Pasteur Institute of India, Coonoor is running Anti Rabies treatment centre 24x7 basis since its inception and it is well known for their academic activities like one week, one month for life science students and three months dissertation programmes to Post Graduate students.

Pasteur Institute of India, Coonoor running a Rabies Diagnostic Laboratory by RFFIT method. RFFIT stands for Rapid Fluorescent Focus Inhibition Test. It is a serum neutralization (inhibition) test, which means it measures the ability of rabies specific antibodies to neutralize rabies virus and prevent the virus from infecting cells. These antibodies are called Rabies Virus Neutralizing Antibodies (RVNA).

Pasteur Institute of India, Coonoor also offer Ph.D. and M.Phil. in Microbiology, Biochemistry and Biotechnology. Pasteur Institute of India, Coonoor Institute affiliated with Bharathiar University, Coimbatore for Ph.D.,

Pasteur Institute of India, Coonoor is also affiliated with Dr. M. G. R. Medical University, Madras for M.D. Microbiology.

During 2007–2008, the production licence of this institute was suspended by Union Government of India along with other public sector vaccine production Institutes namely Central Research Institute, Kasauli and BCG Vaccine Laboratory, Chennai. Later during 2010, the suspension was revoked and Union Government of India allocated about Rs.137 crores to establish a new GMP facility for the production of DPT group of vaccines. After suspension of licence, Pasteur Institute of India, Coonoor produced 494.30 lakh doses of DPT vaccines in the existing facility during the year 2012–13 to 2014–15. Now the facilities are running and expected that they will supply vaccines to UIP by December, 2021.

== Origin of National Institute of Nutrition, Hyderabad ==
National Institute of Nutrition (NIN) was founded by Sir Robert McCarrison in the year 1918 as ‘Beri-Beri’ Enquiry Unit in a single room laboratory at the Pasteur Institute of India, Coonoor, Tamil Nadu. Within a short span of seven years, this unit blossomed into a "Deficiency Disease Enquiry" and later in 1928, emerged as full-fledged "Nutrition Research Laboratories" (NRL) with Dr. McCarrison as its first director. It was shifted to Hyderabad in 1958.

== WHO Influenza centre ==
In 1950, responding to an invitation by the World Health Organization to all its Member States to establish regional laboratories for the study, in collaboration with the World Influenza Centre, of the distribution and antigenic pattern of influenza viruses, the Government of India set up an Influenza Centre at the Pasteur Institute of Southern India, Coonoor.

== Current activities ==
During the recent outbreak of COVID-19, Pasteur Institute of India, Coonoor has carry out COVID - 19 testing with the approval of Indian Council of Medical Research and Ministry of Health and Family Welfare.
