= William Jack (mathematician) =

Scottish mathematician and journalist

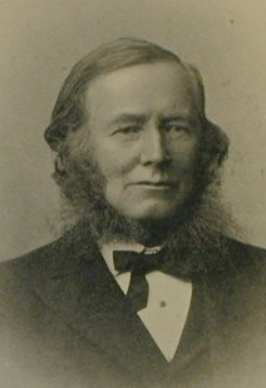
William Jack c. 1880

William Jack FRSE (29 May 1834 – 20 March 1924) was a Scottish mathematician and journalist. He was Editor of the Glasgow Herald newspaper from 1870 to 1876, and Professor of Mathematics at the University of Glasgow from 1879 until 1909.

== Life ==
He was born on 29 May 1834 in Stewarton in Ayrshire the son of Robert Jack of Irvine. He was educated at Irvine Academy, going on to study mathematics at the University of Glasgow, graduating with an MA in 1853. He then continued his studies at the University of Cambridge, graduating with a second MA in 1859.

From 1860 to 1866 he was HM Inspector of Schools for Scotland. In 1866 he accepted the post of Professor of Natural Philosophy (Physics) at Owens College in Manchester and held this position until 1870 when he moved to Glasgow as Editor of the Glasgow Herald newspaper. He left in 1876 to run Macmillan & Co, a London publisher, and in 1879 joined the staff of Glasgow University as Professor of Mathematics. In 1875, he was elected a Fellow of the Royal Society of Edinburgh. His proposers were, William Thomson, Lord Kelvin, James Thomson Bottomley, Allen Thomson and Peter Guthrie Tait.

In 1875 the University of Glasgow awarded him an honorary LLD and in 1902 the University of Manchester awarded him an honorary doctorate (DSc).

In his final working years he lived on the campus of the University of Glasgow, at 10 The College.

He died on 20 March 1924.

== Family ==
He was married to Agnes Jane Nichol (1837–1901), daughter of John Pringle Nichol and sister of Professor John Nichol. Their children included sons William Tullis Jack (b.1862), William Robert Jack (b.1866), Adolphus Alfred Jack (b.1868), and a daughter Agnes Elizabeth Jack (b.1871).
