= James Thomson Bottomley =

Irish physicist

James Thomson Bottomley LLD FRS FRSE
- Born: 10 January 1845; Fort Breda, County Down, Ireland
- Died: 18 May 1926 (aged 81); Glasgow, Scotland
- Education: Queens College, Belfast; Trinity College, Dublin
- Occupation: Physicist

James Thomson Bottomley FRS FRSE (10 January 1845 – 18 May 1926) was an Irish-born British physicist.

He is noted for his work on thermal radiation and on his creation of 4-figure logarithm tables, used to convert long multiplication and division calculations to simpler addition and subtraction before the introduction of fast calculators.

== Background ==
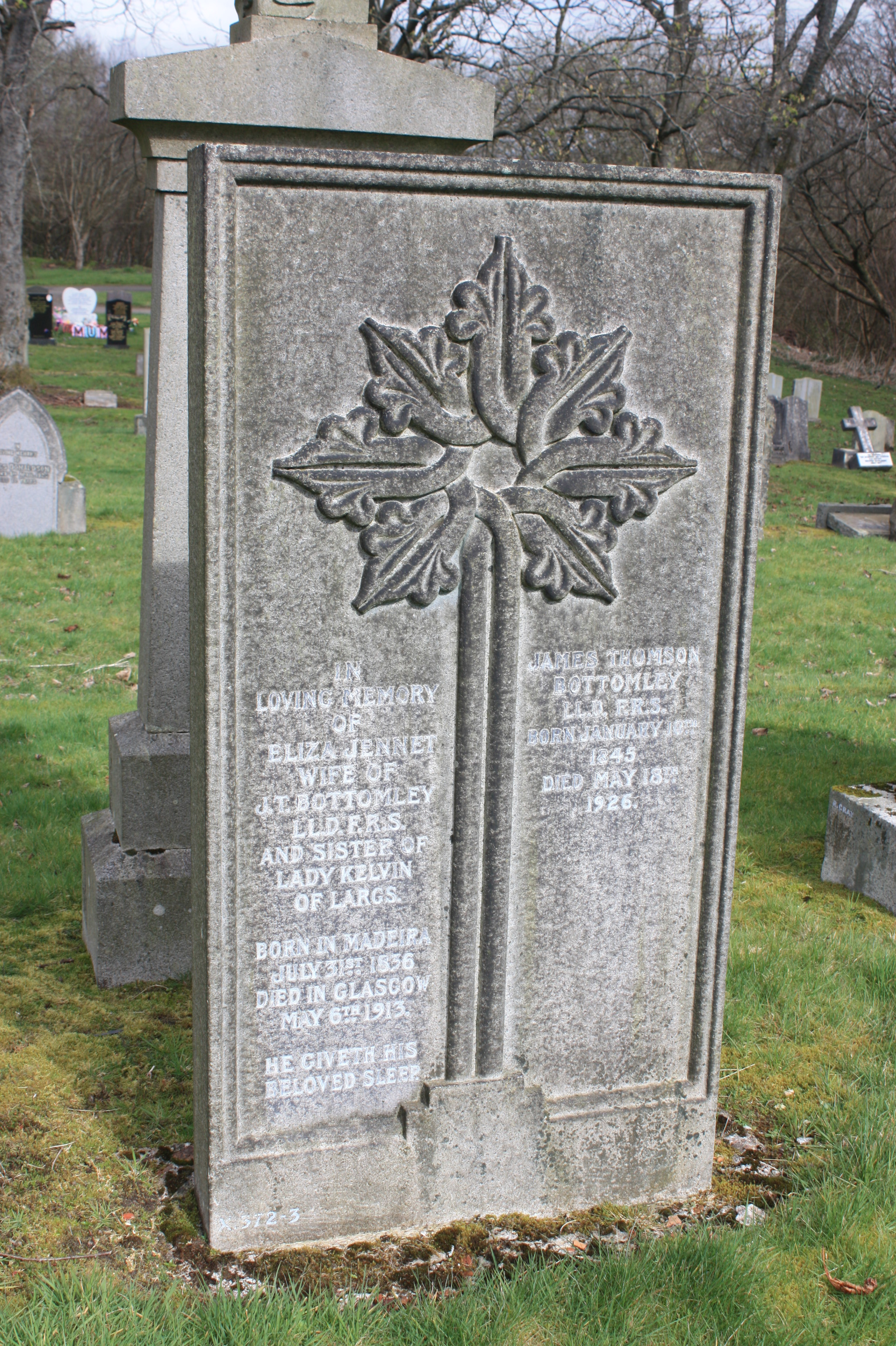
The grave of James Thomson Bottomley, Western Necropolis, Glasgow

He was born in Fort Breda, County Down in Ireland, on 10 January 1845, the son of William Bottomley JP, a merchant in nearby Belfast. His mother, Anna Thomson, was the sister of William Thomson, Lord Kelvin, a connection which served him well throughout his life.

He was educated at Queens College, Belfast and then Trinity College, Dublin (B.A. 1867), originally studying natural philosophy and chemistry.

== Career ==
His first employment was as assistant to scientist Thomas Andrews in Belfast. He then became a Demonstrator at King's College London, first in chemistry and then in physics. In 1870 he became a Demonstrator in Physics at Glasgow University. In 1875 this was retitled the Arnott and Thomson Demonstrator in Experimental Physics, following a bequest from the widow of Neil Arnott.

In 1872 his uncle Lord Kelvin proposed him as a Fellow of the Royal Society of Edinburgh, and this was duly accepted. In June 1888 he was elected a Fellow of the Royal Society in London.

On 5 February 1896 Bottomley was involved in the first demonstration of x-rays in Scotland. His uncle, Lord Kelvin, had received papers from Röntgen, but being ill passed them to his nephew, Bottomley, to deal with, also passing special equipment needed for the demonstration. Bottomley engaged Dr John Macintyre an electrical expert at Glasgow Royal Infirmary to make the demonstration.

In 1899, again with his uncle, the Glasgow engineering firm of Kelvin, Bottomley & Baird (K.B.B) was formed, specialising in gauges and meters but also producing loudspeakers and telephones. He became its chairman in 1908. In 1913 it became a Limited Company. He lived at 13 University Gardens, Glasgow, in this period.

He died in Glasgow on 18 May 1926. His grave stands close to the summit of the Western Necropolis in Glasgow.

The company of Kelvin, Bottomley and Baird continued until 1947.

== Family ==
He married twice: firstly to Annie Elizabeth Heap of Manchester; secondly to Eliza Jennet Blandy, daughter of Charles R Blandy of Madeira.

William Thomson, Lord Kelvin and James Thomson were his uncles.

== Publications ==
- Dynamics: Theoretical Mechanics. 1877
- "Electrometers by J. T. Bottomley". Science Lectures at South Kensington. Vol. I. London: Macmillan & Company. 1878. pp. 216–248.
- On radiation from dull and bright surfaces. London 1887
- On Thermal Radiation in Absolute Measure. 1888
- Four figure mathematical tables: comprising logarithmic and trigonometrical tables, and tables of squares, square roots, and reciprocals.

Professional and academic associations
Preceded by Osborne Reynolds	Secretary of the Manchester Literary and Philosophical Society; 1884–86	Succeeded by Arthur Schuster
