= John Gray McKendrick =

Scottish physiologist

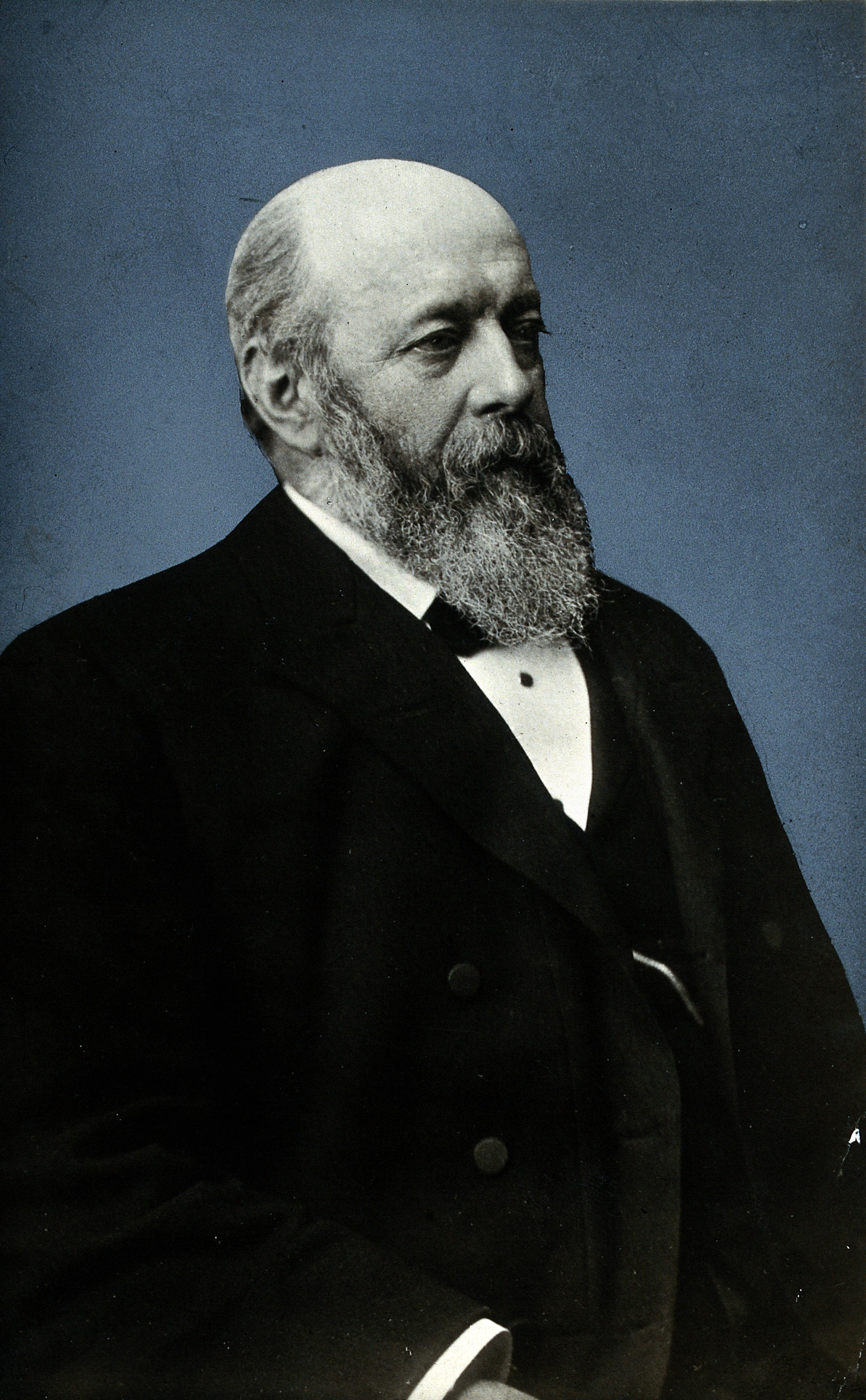
- Born: 12 August 1841; Aberdeen, Scotland
- Died: 2 January 1926 (aged 84); Glasgow, Scotland
- Education: University of Aberdeen; University of Edinburgh; University of Glasgow
- Children: John and Anderson
- Awards: Makdougall-Brisbane Prize
- Scientific career
- Fields: Physiology
- Workplaces: Scotland

John Gray McKendrick (12 August 1841 – 2 January 1926) was a Scottish physiologist. He served as Regius Professor of Physiology at the University of Glasgow from 1876 to 1906, and was co-founder of the Physiological Society.

== Early life ==
McKendrick was born on 12 August 1841, in Aberdeen, to merchant James McKendrick.

He was initially apprenticed as a lawyer (1855–1861) but left law to study medicine at the University of Aberdeen and the University of Edinburgh before graduating in 1864 as an MB ChB. He worked in Chester General Infirmary, Eastern Dispensary at Whitechapel then the Belford Hospital in Fort William.

In 1869, he became the assistant to the Professor of Physiology at the University of Edinburgh, John Hughes Bennett, pursuing his own research into the nervous system and special senses. McKendrick went on to be elected as a Fellow of the Royal Society of Edinburgh in 1873, having been proposed by William Turner, serving as a councillor and eventually the Vice-President from 1894 until 1900. He won the Society's Makdougall-Brisbane Prize for the period 1894–96.

== Glasgow ==
He took up a post at the University of Glasgow in 1873, first as an extramural lecturer (one of his students was the physician Sophia Jex-Blake) and then as Regius Professor of Physiology in 1876. John McKenrick was a popular lecturer, raising significant funds for modernising his department and leading it into concentrating on the study and teaching of physiology. McKendrik sought to reflect his modernising efforts in the renaming his position, from Chair of "Theory of Physic or Institutes of Medicine" to Chair of Physiology in 1893.

In 1874 he was elected a member of the Harveian Society of Edinburgh. McKendrick was a founder member of the Physiological Society and Fullerian Professor of Physiology and Comparative Anatomy at the Royal Institution from 1881 to 1884; he resigned the Fullerian Professor on 5 March 1884 due to ill health. He was elected a Fellow of the Royal Society in 1884.

In 1891 and 1895 was invited to deliver the Royal Institution Christmas Lecture on Life in Motion; or the Animal Machine and Sound, Hearing and Speech respectively. He retired from his university chair in 1906.

== Personal and later life ==
He married Mary Souttar in 1867, and two of their children, John and Anderson, would go on to become fellows of the Royal Society of Edinburgh.

He became Provost of Stonehaven upon his retirement in 1910. He returned to Glasgow around 1925, dying at his home in Rosslyn Terrace on 2 January 1926, aged 84.

Academic offices
Preceded by Edward Albert Sharpey-Schafer	Fullerian Professor of Physiology; 1881–1884	Succeeded by Arthur Gamgee
