= List of things named after Andrey Markov =

This article is a list of things named after Andrey Markov, an influential Russian mathematician.

- Chebyshev–Markov–Stieltjes inequalities
- Dynamics of Markovian particles
- Dynamic Markov compression
- Gauss–Markov theorem
- Gauss–Markov process
- Markov blanket
  - Markov boundary
- Markov chain
  - Markov chain central limit theorem
  - Additive Markov chain
  - Markov additive process
  - Absorbing Markov chain
  - Continuous-time Markov chain
  - Discrete-time Markov chain
  - Nearly completely decomposable Markov chain
  - Quantum Markov chain
  - Telescoping Markov chain
- Markov condition
  - Causal Markov condition
- Markov model
  - Hidden Markov model
  - Hidden semi-Markov model
  - Layered hidden Markov model
  - Hierarchical hidden Markov model
  - Maximum-entropy Markov model
  - Variable-order Markov model
- Markov renewal process
- Markov chain mixing time
- Markov kernel
- Piecewise-deterministic Markov process
- Markovian arrival process
- Markov strategy
- Markov information source
- Markov chain Monte Carlo
  - Reversible-jump Markov chain Monte Carlo
- Markov chain geostatistics
- Markovian discrimination
- Markov decision process
  - Partially observable Markov decision process
- Markov reward model
- Markov switching multifractal
- Markov chain approximation method
- Markov logic network
- Markov matrix
- Markov random field
- Lempel–Ziv–Markov chain algorithm
- Markov partition
- Markov property
- Markov odometer
- Markov perfect equilibrium (game theory)
- Markov's inequality
- Markov spectrum in Diophantine equations
- Markov number (Diophantine equations)
  - Markov tree
  - Markov's theorem
- Markov time
- Markov brothers' inequality
- Markov–Krein theorem
- Markov–Kakutani fixed-point theorem
- Quantum Markov semigroup
- Riesz–Markov–Kakutani representation theorem
- Markov theorem

== Other ==
- Markov (crater)
- 27514 Markov, a main-belt asteroid
