= Time reversibility =

Type of physical or mathematical property

In mathematics and physics, time-reversibility is the property of a process whose governing rules remain unchanged when the direction of its sequence of actions is reversed.

A deterministic process is time-reversible if the time-reversed process satisfies the same dynamic equations as the original process; in other words, the equations are invariant or symmetrical under a change in the sign of time. A stochastic process is reversible if the statistical properties of the process are the same as the statistical properties for time-reversed data from the same process.

== Mathematics ==
In mathematics, a dynamical system is time-reversible if the forward evolution is one-to-one, so that for every state there exists a transformation (an involution) π which gives a one-to-one mapping between the time-reversed evolution of any one state and the forward-time evolution of another corresponding state, given by the operator equation:

$$U_{-t} = \pi \, U_{t}\, \pi$$

Any time-independent structures (e.g. critical points or attractors) which the dynamics give rise to must therefore either be self-symmetrical or have symmetrical images under the involution π.

== Physics ==
In physics, the laws of motion of classical mechanics exhibit time reversibility, as long as the operator π reverses the conjugate momenta of all the particles of the system, i.e. $\mathbf{p} \rightarrow \mathbf{-p}$ (T-symmetry).

In quantum mechanical systems, however, the weak nuclear force is not invariant under T-symmetry alone; if weak interactions are present, reversible dynamics are still possible, but only if the operator π also reverses the signs of all the charges and the parity of the spatial co-ordinates (C-symmetry and P-symmetry). This reversibility of several linked properties is known as CPT symmetry.

Thermodynamic processes can be reversible or irreversible, depending on the change in entropy during the process. Note, however, that the fundamental laws that underlie the thermodynamic processes are all time-reversible (classical laws of motion and laws of electrodynamics), which means that on the microscopic level, if one were to keep track of all the particles and all the degrees of freedom, the many-body system processes are all reversible; However, such analysis is beyond the capability of any human being (or artificial intelligence), and the macroscopic properties (like entropy and temperature) of many-body system are only defined from the statistics of the ensembles. When we talk about such macroscopic properties in thermodynamics, in certain cases, we can see irreversibility in the time evolution of these quantities on a statistical level. Indeed, the second law of thermodynamics predicates that the entropy of the entire universe must not decrease, not because the probability of that is zero, but because it is so unlikely that it is a statistical impossibility for all practical considerations (see Crooks fluctuation theorem).

== Stochastic processes ==
A stochastic process is time-reversible if the joint probabilities of the forward and reverse state sequences are the same for all sets of time increments { τ_{s} }, for s = 1, ..., k for any k:

$$p(x_t, x_{t+\tau_1}, x_{t+\tau_2}, \ldots , x_{t+\tau_k}) = p(x_{t'}, x_{t'-\tau_1}, x_{t'-\tau_2} , \ldots , x_{t'-\tau_k})$$.

A univariate stationary Gaussian process is time-reversible. Markov processes are reversible if and only if their stationary distributions have the property of detailed balance:

$$p(x_t=i,x_{t+1}=j) = \,p(x_t=j,x_{t+1}=i)$$.

Kolmogorov's criterion defines the condition for a Markov chain or continuous-time Markov chain to be time-reversible.

Time reversal of numerous classes of stochastic processes has been studied, including Lévy processes, stochastic networks (Kelly's lemma), birth and death processes, Markov chains, and piecewise deterministic Markov processes.

== Waves and optics ==
Time reversal method works based on the linear reciprocity of the wave equation, which states that the time reversed solution of a wave equation is also a solution to the wave equation since standard wave equations only contain even derivatives of the unknown variables. Thus, the wave equation is symmetrical under time reversal, so the time reversal of any valid solution is also a solution. This means that a wave's path through space is valid when travelled in either direction.

Time reversal signal processing is a process in which this property is used to reverse a received signal; this signal is then re-emitted and a temporal compression occurs, resulting in a reversal of the initial excitation waveform being played at the initial source.

== See also ==
- T-symmetry
- Memorylessness
- Markov property
- Reversible computing
