= Information source (mathematics) =

In mathematics, an information source is a sequence of random variables ranging over a finite alphabet Γ, having a stationary distribution.

The uncertainty, or entropy rate, of an information source is defined as

$$H\{\mathbf{X}\} = \lim_{n\to\infty} H(X_n | X_0, X_1, \dots, X_{n-1})$$

where

$$X_0, X_1, \dots, X_n$$

is the sequence of random variables defining the information source, and

$$H(X_n | X_0, X_1, \dots, X_{n-1})$$

is the conditional information entropy of the sequence of random variables. Equivalently, one has

$$H\{\mathbf{X}\} = \lim_{n\to\infty}
\frac{H(X_0, X_1, \dots, X_{n-1}, X_n)}{n+1}.$$

== See also ==
- Markov information source
- Asymptotic equipartition property
