= Infinitesimal generator =

In mathematics, the term infinitesimal generator may refer to:

- an element of the Lie algebra, associated to a Lie group
- Infinitesimal generator (stochastic processes), of a stochastic process
- infinitesimal generator matrix, of a continuous time Markov chain, a class of stochastic processes
- Infinitesimal generator of a strongly continuous semigroup
