= Piecewise-deterministic Markov process =

In probability theory, a piecewise-deterministic Markov process (PDMP) is a process whose behaviour is governed by random jumps at points in time, but whose evolution is deterministically governed by an ordinary differential equation between those times. The class of models is "wide enough to include as special cases virtually all the non-diffusion models of applied probability." The process is defined by three quantities: the flow, the jump rate, and the transition measure.

The model was first introduced in a paper by Mark H. A. Davis in 1984.

== Examples ==
Piecewise linear models such as Markov chains, continuous-time Markov chains, the M/G/1 queue, the GI/G/1 queue and the fluid queue can be encapsulated as PDMPs with simple differential equations.

== Applications ==
PDMPs have been shown useful in ruin theory, queueing theory, for modelling biochemical processes such as DNA replication in eukaryotes and subtilin production by the organism B. subtilis, and for modelling earthquakes. Moreover, this class of processes has been shown to be appropriate for biophysical neuron models with stochastic ion channels.

== Properties ==
Löpker and Palmowski have shown conditions under which a time reversed PDMP is a PDMP. General conditions are known for PDMPs to be stable.

Galtier et al. studied the law of the trajectories of PDMP and provided a reference measure in order to express a density of a trajectory of the PDMP. Their work opens the way to any application using densities of trajectory. (For instance, they used the density of a trajectories to perform importance sampling, this work was further developed by Chennetier and Al. to estimate the reliability of industrial systems.)

== See also ==
- Jump diffusion, a generalization of piecewise-deterministic Markov processes
- Hybrid system (in the context of dynamical systems), a broad class of dynamical systems that includes all jump diffusions (and hence all piecewise-deterministic Markov processes)
