= G/M/1 queue =

Discipline within mathematical theory

In queueing theory, a discipline within the mathematical theory of probability, the G/M/1 queue represents the queue length in a system where interarrival times have a general (meaning arbitrary) distribution and service times for each job have an exponential distribution. The system is described in Kendall's notation where the G denotes a general distribution, M the exponential distribution for service times and the 1 that the model has a single server.

The arrivals of a G/M/1 queue are given by a renewal process. It is an extension of an M/M/1 queue, where this renewal process must specifically be a Poisson process (so that interarrival times have exponential distribution).

Models of this type can be solved by considering one of two M/G/1 queue dual systems, one proposed by Ramaswami and one by Bright.

== Queue size at arrival times ==
Let $(X_t, t \ge 0)$ be a $G/M(\mu)/1$ queue with arrival times $(A_n, n \in \mathbb{N})$ that have interarrival distribution A. Define the size of the queue immediately before the nth arrival by the process $U_n=X_{A_n-}$. This is a discrete-time Markov chain with stochastic matrix:

$$P = \begin{pmatrix}
1-a_0 & a_0 & 0 & 0 & 0 & \cdots \\
1-(a_0+a_1) & a_1 & a_0 & 0 & 0 & \cdots \\
1-(a_0+a_1+a_2) & a_2 & a_1 & a_0 & 0 & \cdots \\
1-(a_0+a_1+a_2+a_3) & a_3 & a_2 & a_1 & a_0 & \cdots \\
\vdots & \vdots & \vdots & \vdots & \vdots & \ddots
\end{pmatrix}$$

where $a_v=\mathbb{E}\left(\frac{(\mu X)^v e^{-\mu A}}{v!}\right)$.

The Markov chain $U_n$ has a stationary distribution if and only if the traffic intensity $\rho=(\mu \mathbb{E}(A))^{-1}$ is less than 1, in which case the unique such distribution is the geometric distribution with probability $\eta$ of failure, where $\eta$ is the smallest root of the equation $\mathbb{E}(\exp(\mu(\eta-1)A))$.

In this case, under the assumption that the queue is first-in first-out (FIFO), a customer's waiting time W is distributed by:

$$\mathbb{P}(W\le x)=1-\eta \exp(-\mu(1-\eta)x) ~\text{ for } x \geq 0$$

== Busy period ==
The busy period can be computed by using a duality between the G/M/1 model and M/G/1 queue generated by the Christmas tree transformation.

== Response time ==
The response time is the amount of time a job spends in the system from the instant of arrival to the time they leave the system. A consistent and asymptotically normal estimator for the mean response time, can be computed as the fixed point of an empirical Laplace transform.
