= Markov information source =

Sequence of random variables

In mathematics, a Markov information source, or simply, a Markov source, is an information source whose underlying dynamics are given by a stationary finite Markov chain.

== Formal definition ==
An information source is a sequence of random variables ranging over a finite alphabet $\Gamma$, having a stationary distribution.

A Markov information source is then a (stationary) Markov chain $M$, together with a function

$$f:S\to \Gamma$$

that maps states $S$ in the Markov chain to letters in the alphabet $\Gamma$.

A unifilar Markov source is a Markov source for which the values $f(s_k)$ are distinct whenever each of the states $s_k$ are reachable, in one step, from a common prior state. Unifilar sources are notable in that many of their properties are far more easily analyzed, as compared to the general case.

== Applications ==
Markov sources are commonly used in communication theory, as a model of a transmitter. Markov sources also occur in natural language processing, where they are used to represent hidden meaning in a text. Given the output of a Markov source, whose underlying Markov chain is unknown, the task of solving for the underlying chain is undertaken by the techniques of hidden Markov models, such as the Viterbi algorithm.

== See also ==
- Entropy rate
