= Markov reward model =

In probability theory, a Markov reward model or Markov reward process is a stochastic process which extends either a Markov chain or continuous-time Markov chain by adding a reward rate to each state. An additional variable records the reward accumulated up to the current time. Features of interest in the model include expected reward at a given time and expected time to accumulate a given reward. The model appears in Ronald A. Howard's book. The models are often studied in the context of Markov decision processes where a decision strategy can impact the rewards received.

The Markov Reward Model Checker tool can be used to numerically compute transient and stationary properties of Markov reward models.

== Continuous-time Markov chain ==
The accumulated reward at a time t can be computed numerically over the time domain or by evaluating the linear hyperbolic system of equations which describe the accumulated reward using transform methods or finite difference methods.

== See also ==
- Markov chain Monte Carlo
