= Mark H. A. Davis =

British mathematician (1945–2020)

Mark Davis
- Born: Mark Herbert Ainsworth Davis; 25 April 1945
- Died: 18 March 2020 (aged 74); London, England
- Education: University of Cambridge (BA); University of California, Berkeley (PhD)
- Known for: Piecewise deterministic Markov process; Martingale optimality principle in stochastic control; Mathematical Finance
- Awards: Naylor Prize and Lectureship (2002); Fellow of the Royal Statistical Society (2013)
- Scientific career
- Fields: Mathematics; Stochastic control; Mathematical finance
- Workplaces: Imperial College London
- Thesis: Dynamic Programming Conditions for Partially Observable Stochastic Systems (1971)
- Doctoral advisor: Pravin Varaiya
- Website: www.imperial.ac.uk/news/196534/obituary-professor-mark-davis/, sinews.siam.org/Details-Page/obituary-mark-ha-davis

Mark Herbert Ainsworth Davis (25 April 1945 – 18 March 2020) was Professor of Mathematics at Imperial College London. He made fundamental contributions to the theory of stochastic processes, stochastic control and mathematical finance.

== Education and career ==
After completing his BA degree in Electrical Engineering at the University of Cambridge, Davis pursued his PhD degree at UC Berkeley under the supervision of Pravin Varaiya. His PhD thesis, obtained in 1971, initiated the martingale theory of stochastic control. Returning to the UK in 1972, Davis joined the Control Group at Imperial College London. From 1995 to 1999 he was Head of Research and Product Development at Tokyo-Mitsubishi International, leading a quantitative research team providing pricing models and risk analysis for fixed income, equity and credit-related products. He returned to Imperial College London in August 2000 to build Imperial’s Mathematical Finance group within the Department of Mathematics.

== Research ==
Davis made several contributions to the theory of stochastic processes, stochastic control and mathematical finance. His doctoral thesis initiated the martingale approach for the study of conditions for the optimal control of stochastic systems given by Ito equations. The approach permitted arbitrary non-anticipative feedback controls and remains the standard way of formulating stochastic control to this day. One of his key contributions is the martingale optimality principle in stochastic control, which characterizes optimal strategies through the martingale property of the value process. In a 1984 paper he introduced the concept of Piecewise deterministic Markov process, a class of Markov models which have been used in many applications in engineering and science.

In the early 1990s, Davis introduced the deterministic approach to stochastic control by means of appropriate Lagrange multipliers. He was awarded the Naylor Prize by the London Mathematical Society in 2002 for his "contributions to stochastic analysis, stochastic control theory and mathematical finance" and delivered a lecture titled Optimal investment with randomly terminating income.

Davis was one of the founding editors of the journal Mathematical Finance. He authored three books on stochastic analysis and optimization.

== Bibliography ==
- Davis, Mark (1977). Linear Estimation and Stochastic Control (1st ed.).
- Davis, Mark; Vinter, Richard B (1985). Stochastic modelling and control (1st ed.).
- Davis, Mark H; Gabriel Burstein (1992). Deterministic methods in stochastic optimal control (1st ed.).
- Davis, Mark H.A. (1993). Markov models and optimization. Chapman & Hall/CRC Monographs on Statistics & Applied Probability (1st ed.). ISBN 9780412314100.
- Davis, Mark H; Alison Etheridge (2006). Louis Bachelier's Theory of Speculation. Princeton University Press. ISBN 9781400829309. JSTOR j.ctt7scn4.
- Davis, Mark H; Darrell Duffie; Wendell H. Fleming; Steven E. Shreve (1995). Mathematical Finance. Springer.
- Davis, Mark H.A. (2005). "Martingale Representation and All That". Advances in Control, Communication Networks, and Transportation Systems. Systems and Control: Foundations & Applications. Birkhauser. pp. 57–68. doi:10.1007/0-8176-4409-1_4. ISBN 978-0-8176-4385-0.
- Davis, M. H. A. (1984). "Piecewise-Deterministic Markov Processes: A General Class of Non-Diffusion Stochastic Models". Journal of the Royal Statistical Society. Series B (Methodological). 46 (3): 353–388. doi:10.1111/j.2517-6161.1984.tb01308.x. JSTOR 2345677.
