= Dynamic equation =

In mathematics, dynamic equation can refer to:

- difference equation in discrete time
- differential equation in continuous time
- time scale calculus in combined discrete and continuous time
