= Kelly's lemma =

Theorem in probability theory

In probability theory, Kelly's lemma states that for a stationary continuous-time Markov chain, a process defined as the time-reversed process has the same stationary distribution as the forward-time process. The theorem is named after Frank Kelly.

== Statement ==
For a continuous time Markov chain with an at most countable state space $S$ and transition-rate matrix $Q$ (with elements $q_{ij}$), if we can find a set of non-negative numbers $q_{ij}'$ and a positive measure $\pi$ that satisfy the following conditions:

$$\begin{align}
\sum_{j \in S} q_{ij} &= \sum_{j \in S} q'_{ij} \quad \forall i\in S\\
\pi_i q_{ij} &= \pi_jq_{ji}' \quad \forall i,j \in S,
\end{align}$$

then $q_{ij}'$ are the rates for the reversed process and $\pi$ is proportional to the stationary distribution for both processes.

=== Proof ===
Given the assumptions made on the $q_{ij}$ and $\pi$ we have

$$\sum_{i \in S} \pi_i q_{ij} = \sum_{i \in S} \pi_j q'_{ji} = \pi_j \sum_{i \in S} q'_{ji} = \pi_j \sum_{i \in S} q_{ji} =\pi_j,$$

so the global balance equations are satisfied and the measure $\pi$ is proportional to the stationary distribution of the original process. By symmetry, the same argument shows that $\pi$ is also proportional to the stationary distribution of the reversed process.
