= Telescoping Markov chain =

In probability theory, a telescoping Markov chain (TMC) is a vector-valued stochastic process that satisfies a Markov property and admits a hierarchical format through a network of transition matrices with cascading dependence.

For any $N> 1$ consider the set of spaces $\{\mathcal S^\ell\}_{\ell=1}^N$. The hierarchical process $\theta_k$ defined in the product-space

$$\theta_k = (\theta_k^1,\ldots,\theta_k^N)\in\mathcal S^1\times\cdots\times\mathcal S^N$$

is said to be a TMC if there is a set of transition probability kernels $\{\Lambda^n\}_{n=1}^N$ such that

1. $\theta_k^1$ is a Markov chain with transition probability matrix $\Lambda^1$
  $$\mathbb P(\theta_k^1=s\mid\theta_{k-1}^1=r)=\Lambda^1(s\mid r)$$
2. there is a cascading dependence in every level of the hierarchy,
  $\mathbb P(\theta_k^n=s\mid\theta_{k-1}^n=r,\theta_k^{n-1}=t)=\Lambda^n(s\mid r,t)$ for all $n\geq 2.$
3. $\theta_k$ satisfies a Markov property with a transition kernel that can be written in terms of the $\Lambda$'s,
  $$\mathbb P(\theta_{k+1}=\vec s\mid \theta_k=\vec r) = \Lambda^1(s_1\mid r_1) \prod_{\ell=2}^N \Lambda^\ell(s_\ell \mid r_\ell,s_{\ell-1})$$

where $\vec s = (s_1,\ldots,s_N)\in\mathcal S^1\times\cdots\times\mathcal S^N$ and $\vec r = (r_1,\ldots,r_N)\in\mathcal S^1\times\cdots\times\mathcal S^N.$
