= Stationary distribution =

Stationary distribution may refer to:

- Discrete-time Markov chain § Stationary distributions and continuous-time Markov chain § Stationary distribution, a special distribution for a Markov chain such that if the chain starts with its stationary distribution, the marginal distribution of all states at any time will always be the stationary distribution. Assuming irreducibility, the stationary distribution is always unique if it exists, and its existence can be implied by positive recurrence of all states. The stationary distribution has the interpretation of the limiting distribution when the chain is irreducible and aperiodic.
- The marginal distribution of a stationary process or stationary time series
- The set of joint probability distributions of a stationary process or stationary time series

In some fields of application, the term stable distribution is used for the equivalent of a stationary (marginal) distribution, although in probability and statistics the term has a rather different meaning: see stable distribution.

Crudely stated, all of the above are specific cases of a common general concept. A stationary distribution is a specific entity which is unchanged by the effect of some matrix or operator: it need not be unique. Thus stationary distributions are related to eigenvectors for which the eigenvalue is unity.

== See also ==
- Stationary ergodic process
- Perron–Frobenius theorem
- Stationary state or ground state in quantum mechanics
