= Transition-rate matrix =

Matrix describing continuous-time Markov chains

In probability theory, a transition-rate matrix (also known as a Q-matrix, intensity matrix, or infinitesimal generator matrix) is an array of numbers describing the instantaneous rate at which a continuous-time Markov chain transitions between states.

In a transition-rate matrix $Q$ (sometimes written $A$), element $q_{ij}$ (for $i \neq j$) denotes the rate departing from $i$ and arriving in state $j$. The rates $q_{ij} \geq 0$, and the diagonal elements $q_{ii}$ are defined such that

$$q_{ii} = -\sum_{j\neq i} q_{ij}$$,

and therefore the rows of the matrix sum to zero.

Up to a global sign, a large class of examples of such matrices is provided by the Laplacian of a directed, weighted graph. The vertices of the graph correspond to the Markov chain's states.

== Properties ==
The transition-rate matrix has following properties:

- There is at least one eigenvector with a vanishing eigenvalue, exactly one if the graph of $Q$ is strongly connected.
- All other eigenvalues $\lambda$ fulfill $0 > \mathrm{Re}\{\lambda\} \geq 2 \min_i q_{ii}$.
- All eigenvectors $v$ with a non-zero eigenvalue fulfill $\sum_{i}v_{i} = 0$.
- The Transition-rate matrix satisfies the relation $Q=P'(0)$ where P(t) is the continuous stochastic matrix.

== Example ==
An M/M/1 queue, a model which counts the number of jobs in a queueing system with arrivals at rate λ and services at rate μ, has transition-rate matrix

$$Q=\begin{pmatrix}
-\lambda & \lambda \\
\mu & -(\mu+\lambda) & \lambda \\
&\mu & -(\mu+\lambda) & \lambda \\
&&\mu & -(\mu+\lambda) & \ddots &\\
&&&\ddots&\ddots
\end{pmatrix}.$$

== See also ==
- Stochastic matrix
