= Victoria Butterfly Gardens =

Zoo in British Columbia, Canada

Coordinates: 48°33′51.52″N 123°26′20.84″W

- Interactive map of Victoria Butterfly Gardens
- Location: Brentwood Bay, British Columbia, Canada
- Land area: 11,000 sq. ft
- No. of species: 75 species of butterflies
- Website: butterflygardens.com

The Victoria Butterfly Gardens is located in the Greater Victoria region of Brentwood Bay, British Columbia, Canada. It is one of the most popular tourist sites in the Victoria area. The Victoria Butterfly Gardens are known for having different species of butterflies and moths in their indoor facility, as well as birds, fishes, frogs, an iguana, geckoes and tortoises, along with the newly added Insectarium. The Gardens is closed Christmas day.

== Environment ==
The indoor facility of the gardens is computer-controlled to maintain the temperature, light, mist, cooling and humidity of the simulated 12,000-square-foot (1,100 m^{2}) rainforest. The environment of the simulated indoor rainforest has over 200 species of tropical plants, which includes carnivorous plants and a waterfall that connects to the meandering stream.

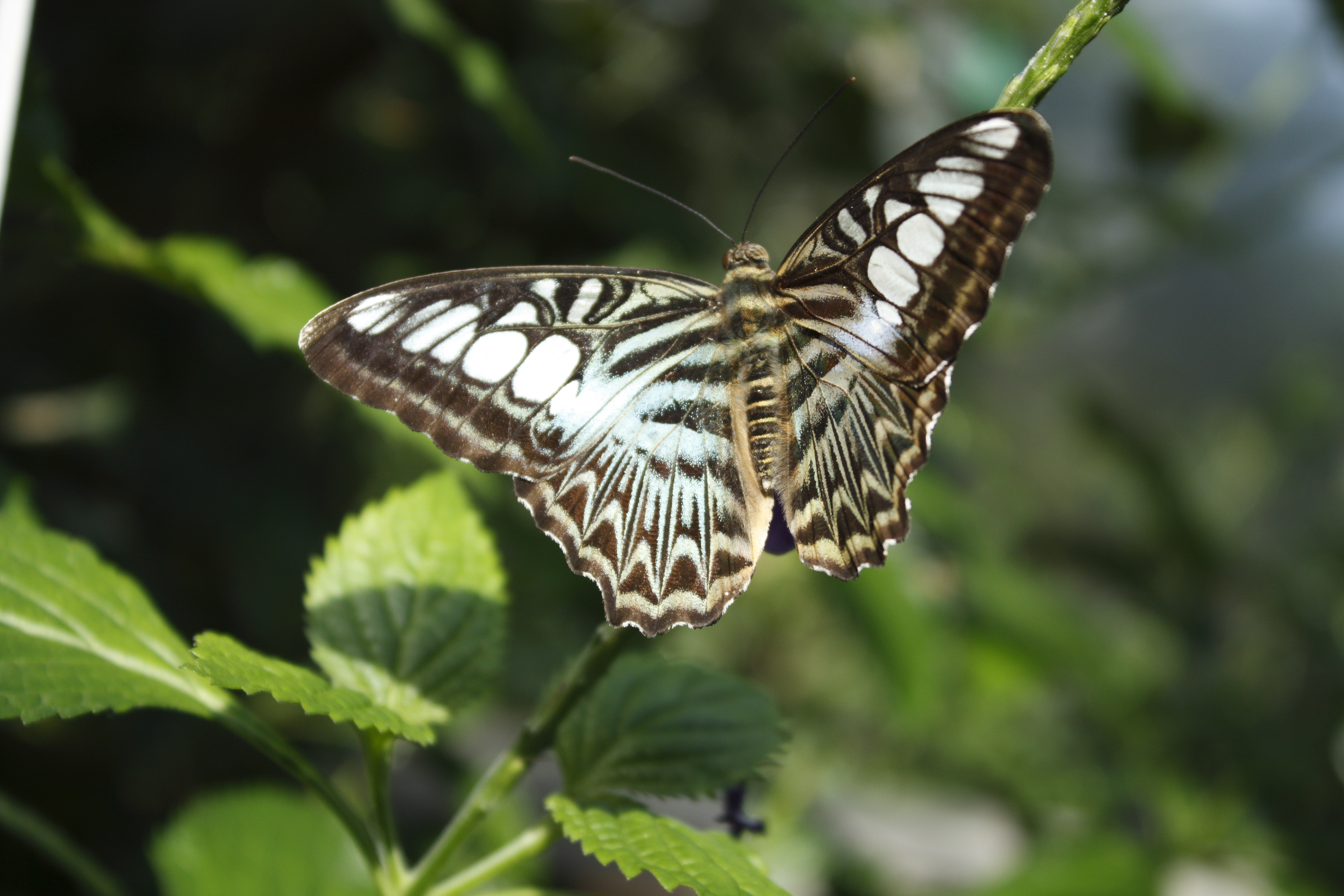

== Butterflies ==
The Victoria Butterfly Gardens have over 75 species (over 4,000 in population) of butterflies and moths that fly, eat and lay eggs freely inside the indoor facility. Visitors to the gardens can watch the nursery window and view the butterflies emerging from the chrysalis, which is around 400-700 emerging butterflies, per week, that are captive-bred and shipped by butterfly farms from Costa Rica, Malaysia and London, England.

The plants in the gardens are known as "host" and "food" plants for the butterflies. The "host plants" are used by butterflies to lay their eggs, outside of the nursery window. The "food plants" are used by butterflies to feed on, after they emerge from their chrysalis. However, some butterflies feed from the 'feeding trays', placed throughout the gardens. In the feeding trays, fermenting fruit is provided and the butterflies feed off of the naturally produced alcohol. Most frequently visiting the trays are usually blue morphos and owl butterflies. Some of the most commonly seen butterflies include the aforementioned blue morphos and owl butterflies, in addition to many members of the Helicon family of butterflies.

== Birds and fish ==
The streams of the gardens are home to two varieties of carp, the gin rin koi and butterfly koi, and the albino oscar.

All over the gardens, there are different kinds of birds. Some of them share the air and fly amongst the butterflies, some swim in the streams with the fish. The birds of the gardens are popular attractions, because of their antics and behaviours that raises the entertainment value for the visitors. The most popular birds in the gardens are Leo the orange-winged amazon parrot, Little E the eclectus parrot, Shadow the blue and gold macaw, and Mango, the Caribbean flamingo, whom usually interact or show off their behaviours to visitors. Other such birds at the gardens include finches, canaries, parakeets, and more.

== Butterfly Places and Pumpkin Faces ==
The first annual Butterfly Places and Pumpkin Faces was held on October 19, 2008, as a fundraiser for the pediatric ward in the Victoria General Hospital.
