= Koi pond =

Ponds used for holding koi

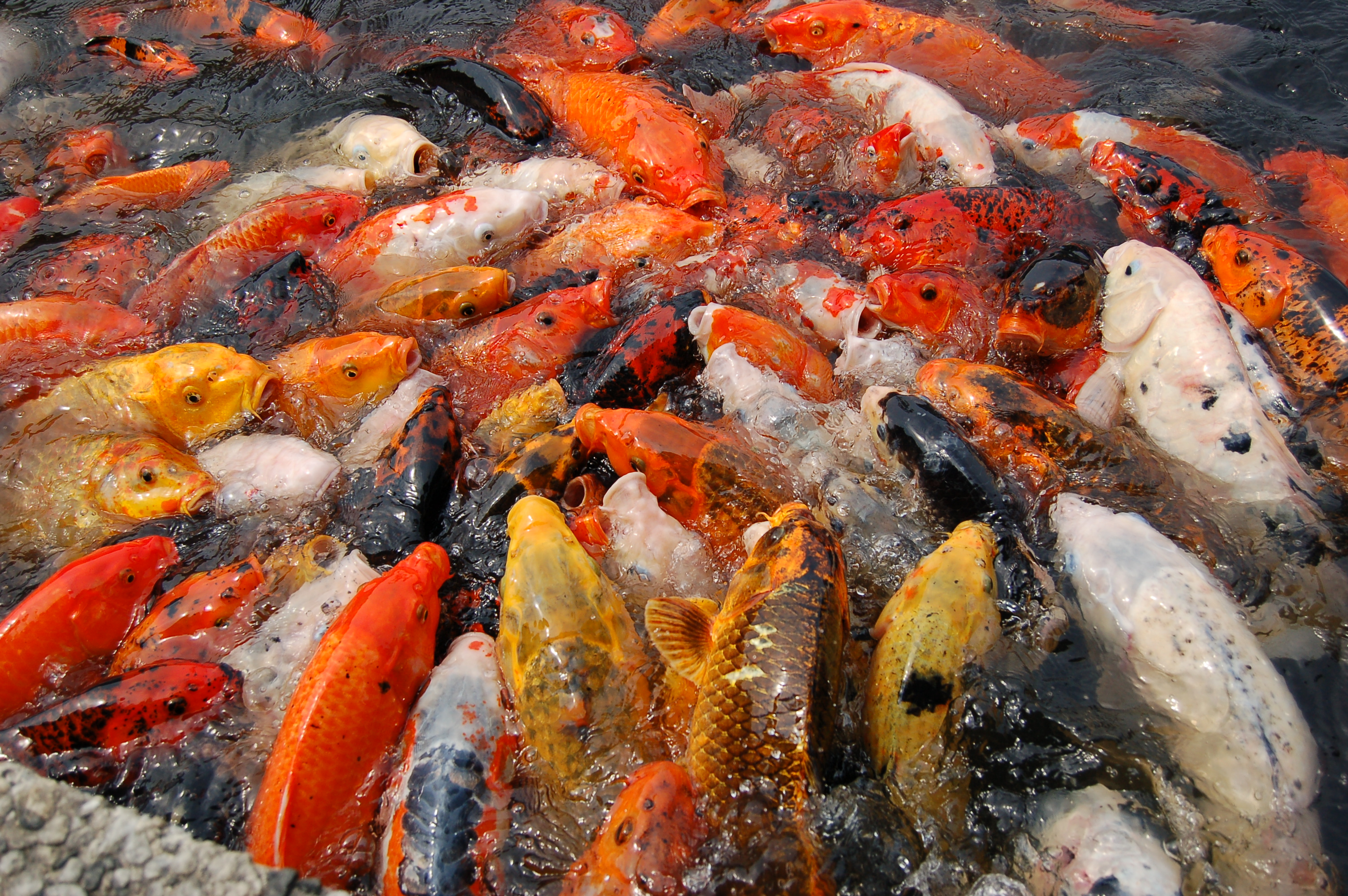
Ornamental pond stocked with koi

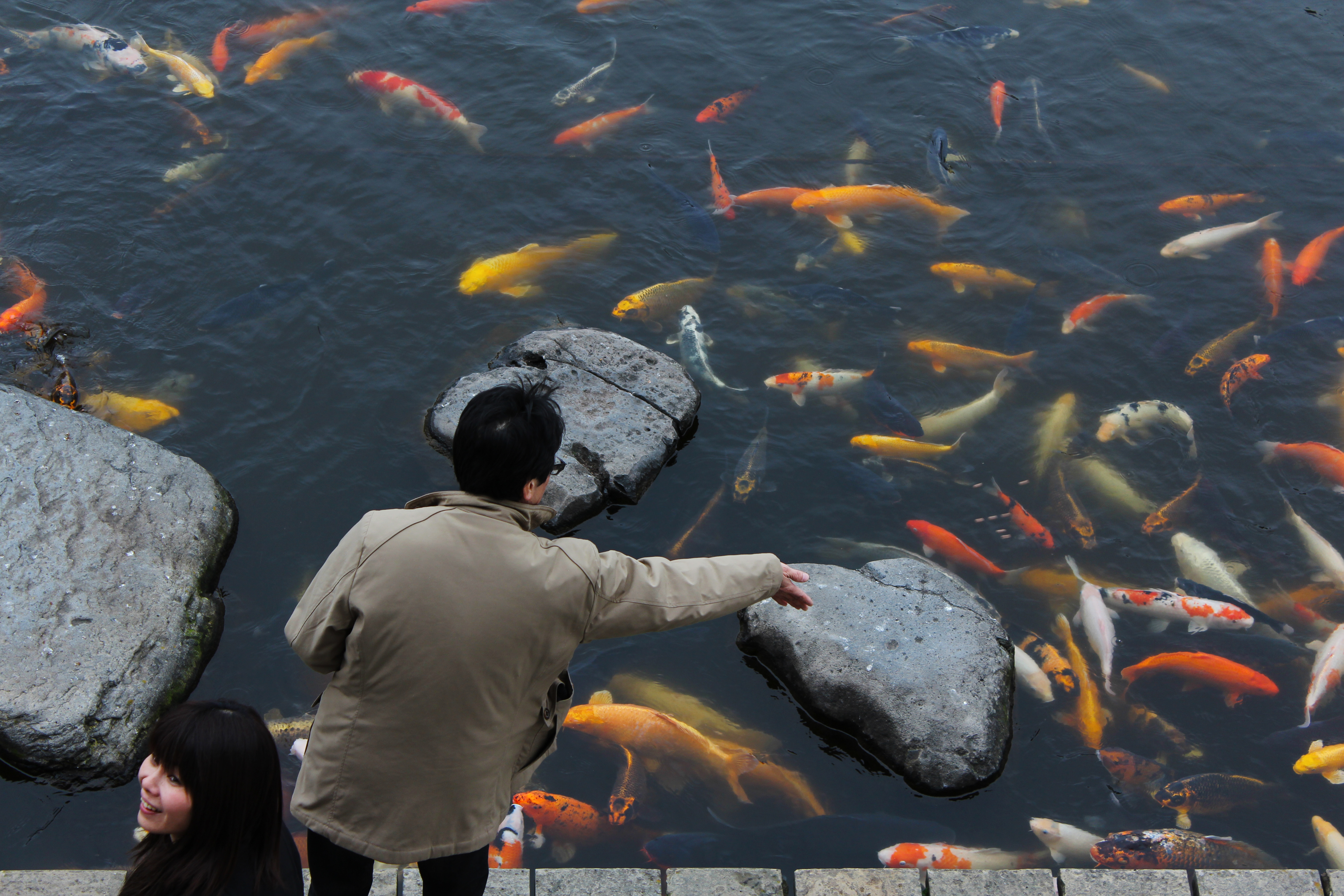
Koi pond in Nagasaki, Japan

Koi ponds are ponds used for holding koi carp, usually as part of a garden. Koi ponds can be designed specifically to promote health and growth of the Nishikigoi or Japanese Ornamental Carp. Koi ponds or lakes are a traditional feature of Japanese gardens, but many hobbyists use special ponds in small locations, with no attempt to suggest a natural landscape feature.

The architecture of the koi pond can have a great effect on the health and well-being of the koi. The practice of keeping koi often revolves around "finishing" a koi at the right time. The concept of finishing means that the fish has reached its highest potential. Koi clubs hold shows where koi keepers bring their fish for judging.

== History ==
=== Representation of the Koi pond ===
In some interpretations influenced by Feng Shui principles, the placement of water features is believed to symbolize prosperity and harmony within a landscape. In Japanese garden design, koi ponds are often integrated as aesthetic focal points emphasizing tranquility and natural balance.

== Components ==
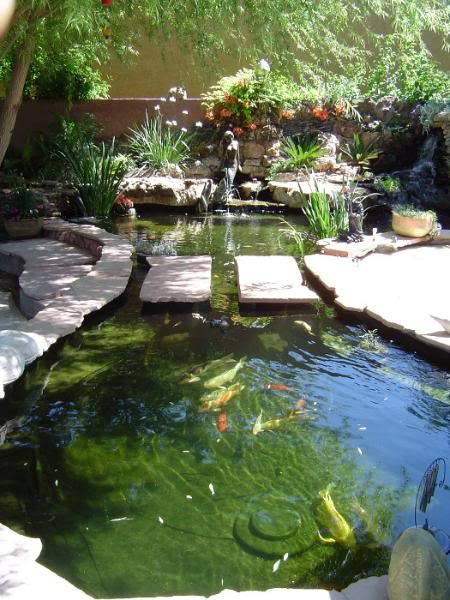
Koi pond with extensive filtration

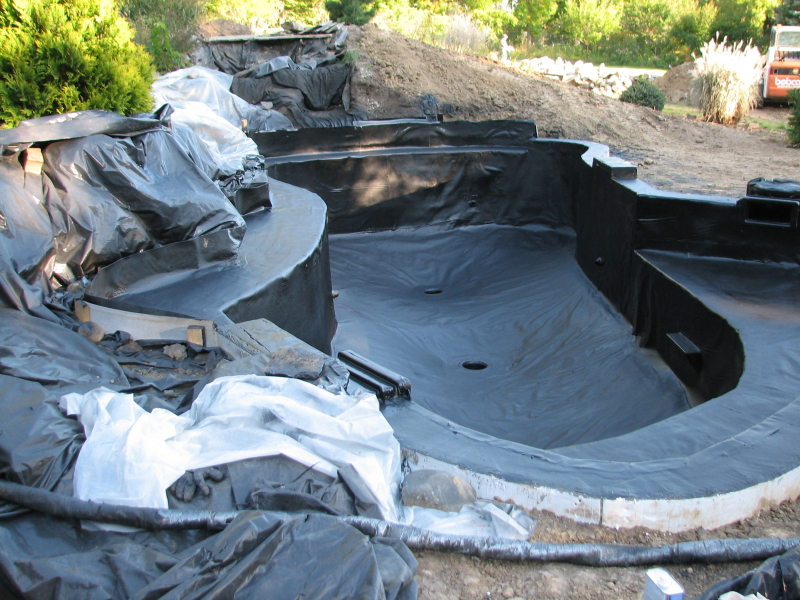
Pond with liner installed, note vertical walls and bottom drains

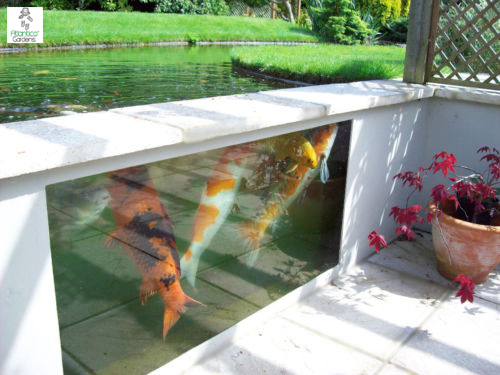
Pond windows are increasingly installed in contemporary koi ponds.

=== Skimmer ===
The skimmer allows water to be drawn from the surface of the pond. It collects leaves, pollen, twigs, uneaten food and all other kinds of floating debris. The skimmer usually has a clean out basket that can be quickly emptied on a regular basis to allow the skimmer to run properly. Most floating skimmers will also have a foam that sits underneath the basket to filter out the finer particles. Also, depending on the skimmer, fish and other live critters may get stuck in the skimmer, so it is a good idea to check the skimmer on a regular basis. If there is a self fill valve in the pond, try to install it out in the pond area and not in the skimmer. If the skimmer becomes clogged with debris and the water level drops in the skimmer, the fill valve may over fill the pond.

=== Bottom drain ===
Bottom drains are not required in water gardens but are very beneficial for Koi Ponds. When used in a pond that does or does not have rocks on the bottom, a bottom drain allows the heavy solids to be carried to the mechanical filter. In addition, many bottom drains are equipped with air diffusers, adding much needed oxygen to a pond. And depending on the size of the pond, larger ponds will work more efficient with a bottom drain especially if there are jets in place pushing all debris toward the drain. Also, if there is a place where an external pump can be installed, you can have the water pumped out to a drainage area quicker and more efficiently.

=== Mechanical filter ===
Mechanical filtration can be accomplished in many different ways. The job of this filter is to trap solids, preventing them from clogging the Biological filter. The mechanical filter should be backwashed or cleaned out often. Types of mechanical filters include Vortex, brushes, matting, sand and gravel, sieve screen, and settlement chamber. If a BOG is installed into the pond, plants can be planted in it to filter the water even more.

=== Biological filter ===
Biological filters convert the nitrogenous wastes from the fish. This cycle is called the nitrogen cycle. A biofilter can be constructed in many different ways. It is important for the koi keeper to understand how the filter is to be cleaned before they install one. Proper and regular cleaning of the mechanical and biological filters is critical for the health and quality of the koi. Bio-filters are sometimes divided into sub groups such as aerated or non-aerated. Types of bio-filters include:

- Moving bed filter – aerated
- Bakki shower or Trickle filter – aerated
- Sand filter – not aerated
- Cross-flow filter – typically not aerated
- Bead filter

For natural Eco System ponds, beneficial bacteria must be put into the pond to assist in the natural balance of the pond. When this is accomplished, and the pond is a sustainable ecosystem pond, try not to change out the water too often because you could be upsetting the natural balance of the pond. When the pond becomes balanced, it will sustain itself.

=== Ultraviolet light ===
An ultraviolet light is used to make algae flocculate (form into clumps), so that they can be removed by mechanical filtration. The UV sterilizer will also kill free-floating bacteria in the pond water. And in some cases, the UV light can kill some types of pathogens in the water that can infect the fish and possibly kill them.

=== Water and air pumps ===
Water pumps move water through the filter system and back to the pond in a recirculating manner. The important thing to understand about pumps is that they be sized to the pond and the filter system. When the total back pressure in the system is considered, a pump should be circulating the total volume of water at least once per hour for proper water quality. An air pump can be used to increase dissolved oxygen. In a heavily stocked koi pond, an air pump is a necessity. Along with the water pumps, there must be jets placed in areas where there is little to no water flow. Jets may keep stagnant water from forming and possibly assist in preventing mosquito larva from breeding.

== Care ==
=== Winter conditions ===
When temperatures are approximately 10°C, koi enter a dormant state in which feeding activity is greatly reduced. In order to deal with these colder climates, ponds are often constructed with sufficient depth-commonly 3-5 feet to prevent the ponds from freezing completely, allowing the koi fish to swim under the ice layer.

== Photo gallery ==
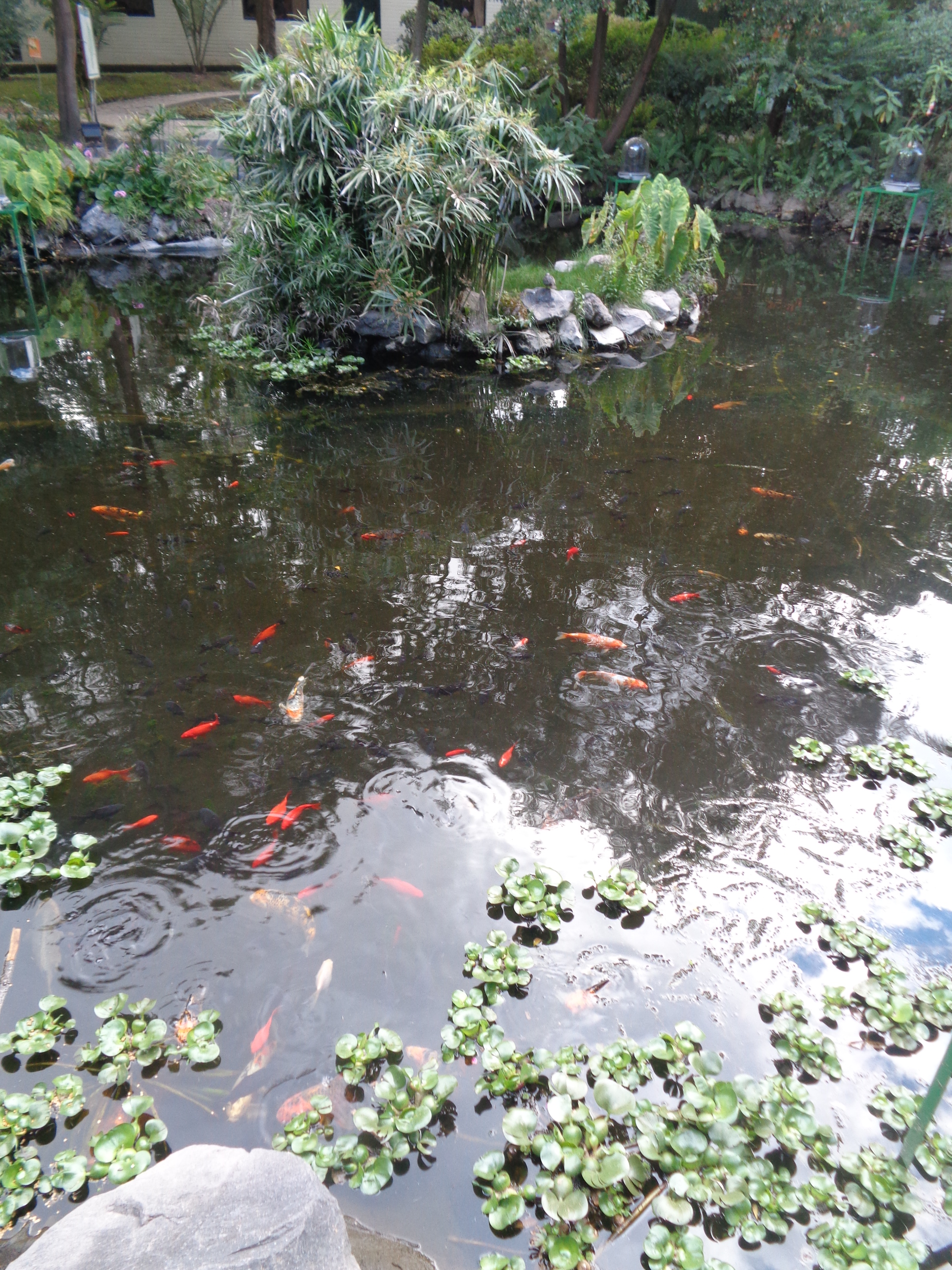

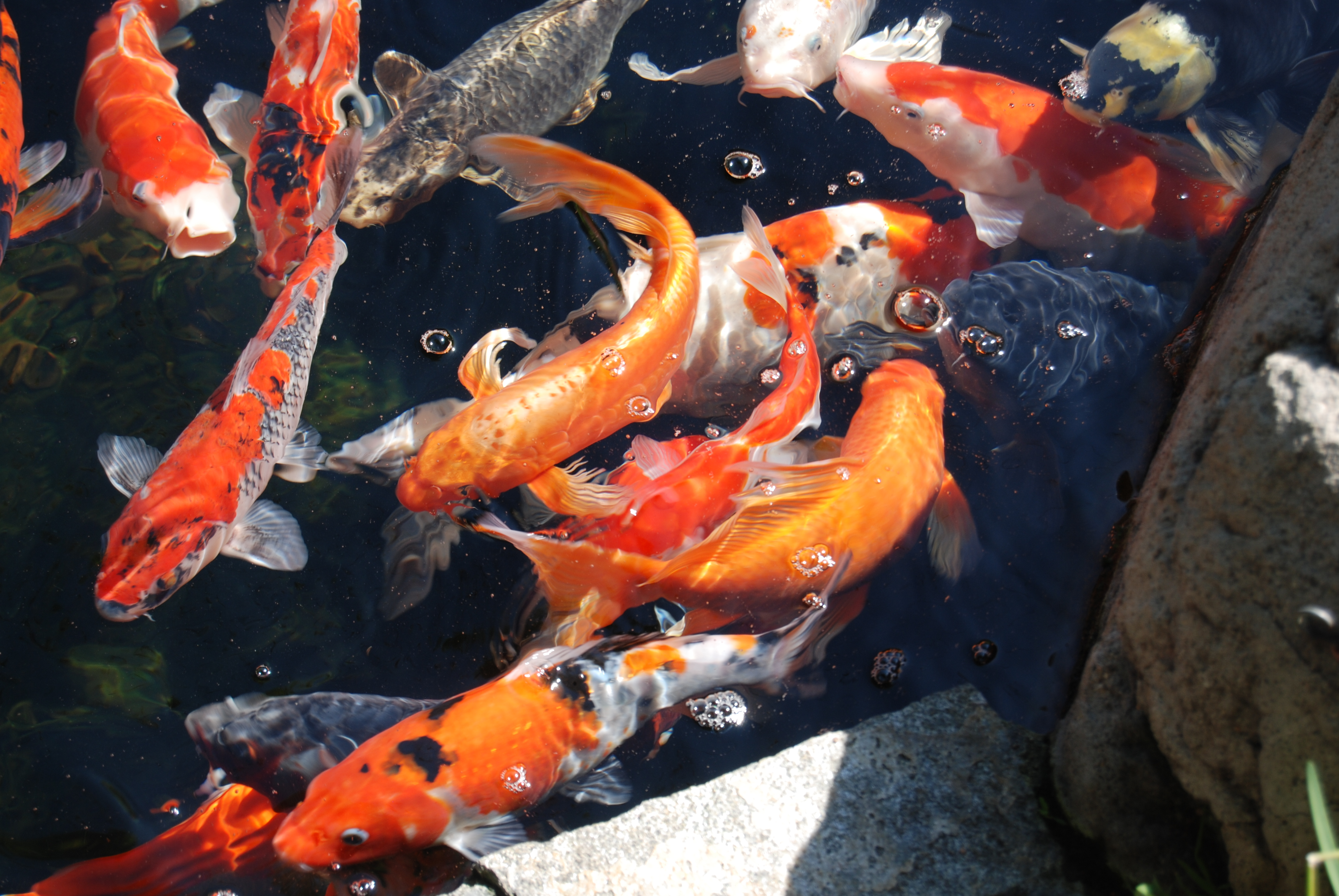

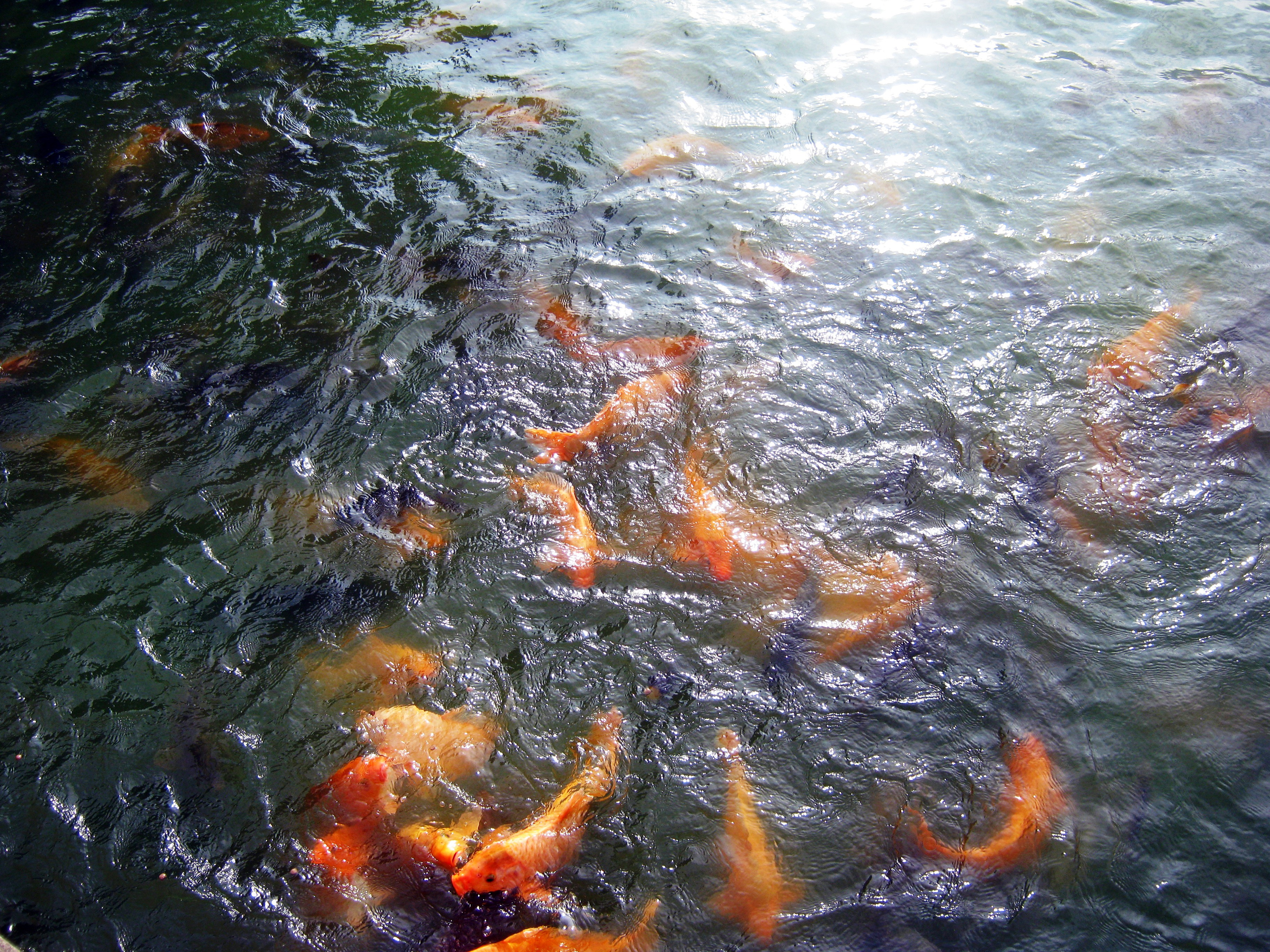

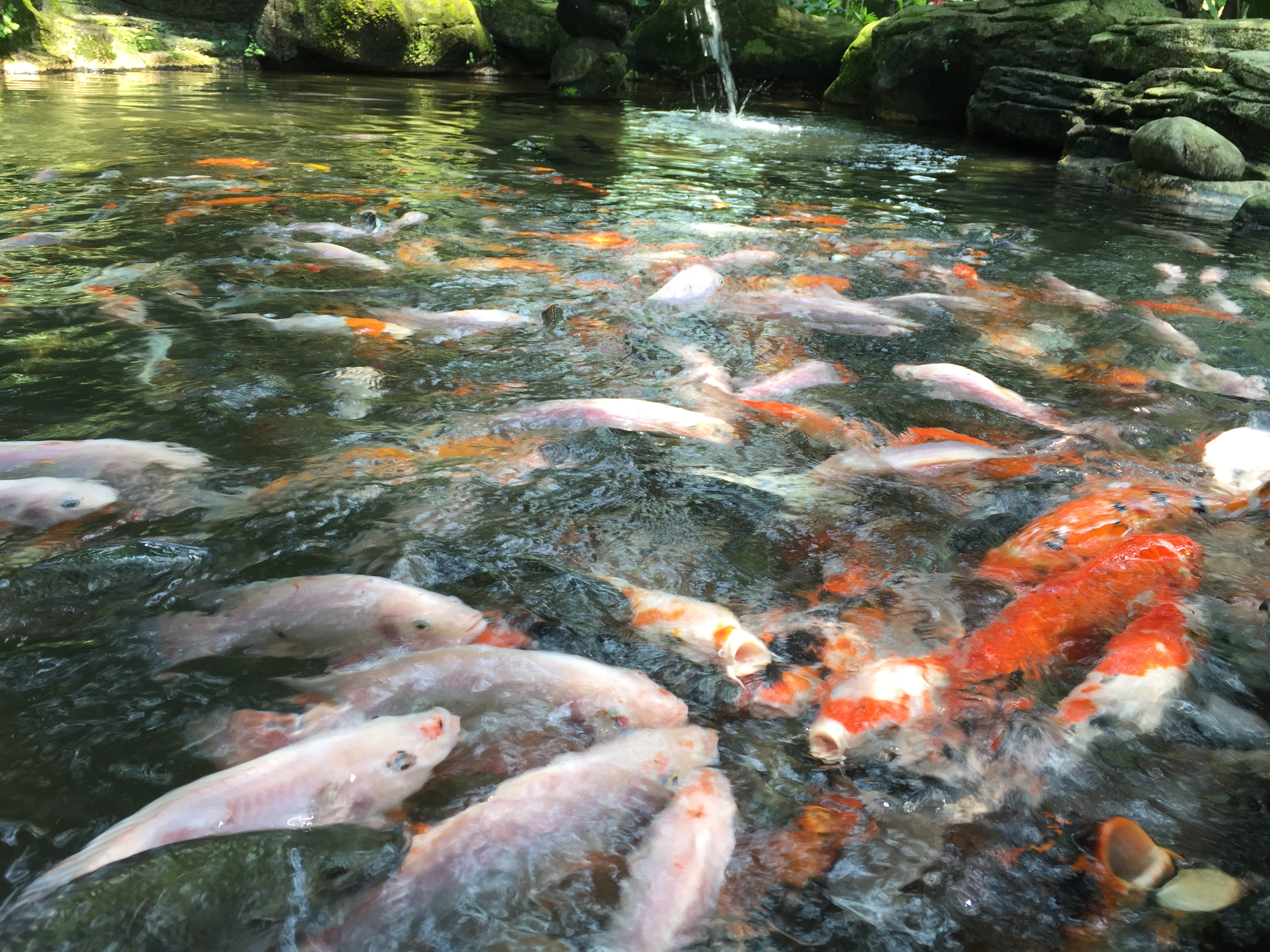

== See also ==
- Biotope
- Garden pond
