= Showa (fish) =

Ornamental carp

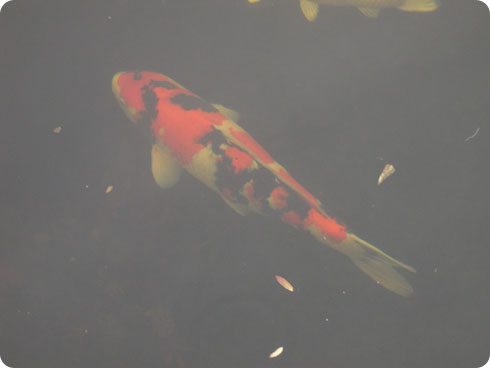

The Showa, properly called Showa Sanshoku (昭和三色), literally "Showa [era] three-colors" in Japanese, is a variety of ornamental koi (carp). It is named for the Shōwa era (the period of Emperor Hirohito's reign, 1926–1989), during which it was first stabilized and named. In the koi world, naming a variety after an imperial era, such as the Taishō Sanke (大正三色), which is named for the Taishō era (1912-1926), is a way to honor the time period in which the breed was perfected.

The Showa has a black (sumi) body, with red (hi) and white (shiro) markings across the body. The Showa is one of the gosanke; the ‘Big Three’, consisting of Kohaku, Sanke, and Showa.

Showa were originally developed by Jukichi Hoshino about 1927. He paired a Kohaku and a Ki-Utsuri. These early Showas had a greyish shiro and striped fins. The sumi (black) was dull and the hi was weak. Later, Showa were bred to Asagi which helped produce the black motoguro markings in the fins. However, the hi was still weak and pale. In 1964 Tomiji Kobayashi crossed a male Kohaku with a female Showa to produce a new style Showa with a large crimson red pattern. It also had a brighter white ground without netting. However, the Kobayashi Showa still suffered from small size and poor body shape. A major leap forward came as a result of a spectacular (for its time) inazuma (lightning pattern) showa bred by Minoru Mano. The inazuma showa represented a huge improvement in body conformation and overall color quality, and it was used as a brood fish for many years after.
