= Kōhaku (fish) =

Ornamental carp

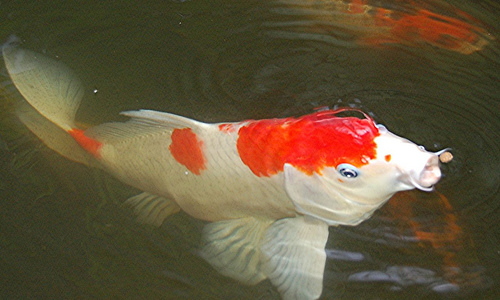

Kōhaku (紅白 (kōhaku; "red and white")) is a variety of ornamental koi (carp). The Kōhaku has a white body, with red markings across the body. It is considered one of the ‘Big Three’ varieties of Koi, along with the Sanke, and Showa.

The Kōhaku breed is believed to be one of the first ornamental carp varieties developed. The variety dates to 1888, when a man named Kunizo Hiroi bred a red-headed female koi with one of his own males, whose markings resembled cherry blossoms, thus creating the now extinct Gosuke bloodline from which all of the known Kōhaku bloodlines established (Tomoin, Sensuke, Yagozen, Manzo). Today, the Tomoin and Yagozen are the two remaining major Kōhaku bloodlines in Japan. The Kōhaku remains one of the most popular breeds in Japan. The bright red markings are known as hi (緋).

== Characteristics ==
Kōhaku are bred to have the following characteristics:

1. The hi (red markings) should be bright, and the colour should be even across the whole of the body. The hi should not have white scales within them (this is considered a serious fault). The markings should be balanced, although not strictly symmetrical.
2. The edges of the hi should be well defined. The edges are never as sharp near the head as they are near the tail, but they should still be of a good standard.
3. The hi should not extend past the eyes, not into the fins, but this standard is not strictly adhered to.
4. The hi should not extend past the lateral line. This requirement dates from a time then all koi were viewed in a pond from the top. Fish bred to be kept in tanks may not necessarily adhere to his standard.
5. The hi should not spread beyond the nostrils, nor should it extend to the tail fin.
6. There must be hi on the head of the fish. Fish without hi on the head are called bozu (坊主, bōzu), which refers to the shaven head of a buddhist monk: this is considered a fault.

== Standards ==
These are Japanese exhibition standards, and fish purchased simply for display in private homes or to be kept as pets, do not necessarily adhere to these standards. There are a number of words used to describe the markings on a kōhaku:

- Akamuji (赤無字) An Akamuji is a plain red fish that occurs normally in the breeding of Kōhaku. In Japan, this was formerly considered a fault when breeding Kōhaku and most fry with this coloration were culled; but since the early 1990s has increased in popularity. In exhibition, Akamuji are usually exhibited under the Kawarimono category, as Benigoi (紅鯉) or as Hiaka (緋赤). An Akamuji with white patches on the tips of its fins is called an Aka Hajiro (赤羽白).
- Shiromuji (白無字) A Shiromuji is a plain white fish. This variety occur normally as part of the breeding of Kōhaku and is not valued in Japan. A similar fish, but with metallic scales Platinum koi (プラチナ鯉, Purachina-goi) are very popular.
- Komoyō (小模様) In a Komoyo, the size of the markings is small (less than a quarter the length of the fish). These fish are not highly valued.
- Ōmoyō (大模様) An Omoyou has large markings, at least a quarter the length of the fish. This is desirable, because as a fish ages, the markings will separate and form interesting patterns.
- Dangara (段柄) Dangara refers to a pattern of well-separated markings that resemble stepping stones in a pool. These are greatly valued in competition:
  - A single stripe from head to tail is called ストライトand is not valued in Japan, but if it forms a zig-zag pattern, then this is called inazuma (稲妻). The name, 'inazuma', originates from the 1970 All Nippon Show, when the winner featured this pattern.
  - Two steps (二段, nidan) Nidan refers to a Dangara with two red patches.
  - Three steps (三段, sandan) A Sandan has three patches.
  - Four steps (四段, yondan). A Yondan has four.
  - A Kōhaku with more than four markings must be a Komoyo, and is therefore of little value.
- Odome (尾止め). This refers to the shiroji between the end of the final hi on the body and where the tail bone joins the body. This should be about 2 cm in size, although smaller or larger area of shiroji may be acceptable. The word Odome, is literally translated as the honorific form of "to stop", referring to the stop or end of the hi pattern on the koi.
- Zubonhaki (ズボン履き). This refers to a hi that wraps around the tail. This is not favoured. In Japanese it means "to wear trousers". The opposite fault (no hi at all near the tail) is known as "bongiri" (shirt but no trousers).
- Makibara (卷腹). A hi that wraps around the belly of the fish is called "makibara."
- Kuchibeni (口紅). This means "lipstick" and refers to a fish where the red covers the mouth. This is usually considered a fault in Japan.

== Bibliography ==
Tamadachi, Michugo (May 1, 1990). "Koi varieties". The Cult of the Koi. Neptune City, New Jersey: TFH Publications. p. 288. ISBN 978-0866220859. OCLC 21986437 – via Internet Archive.org.
