= Bakki shower =

Type of water filtration system

Bakki showers are a type of trickle filtration.

== Origins ==
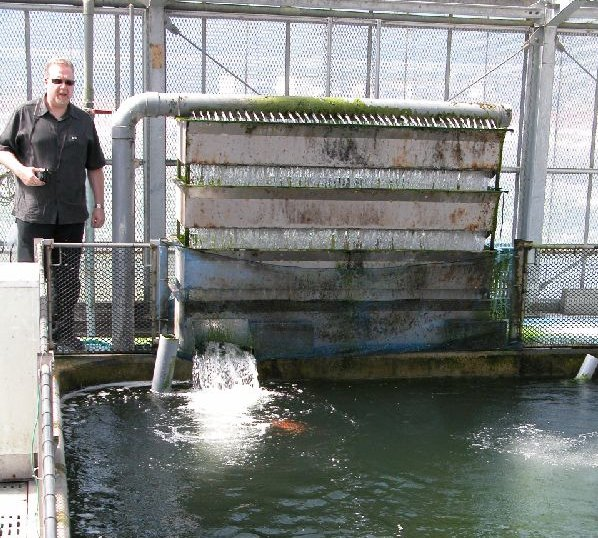
Bakki Shower at the koi farm

First developed by the Momotaro Japanese koi farm, the bakki shower attempts to simulate natures way of filtering water. Similar to a mountain stream where water cascades over rocks.

Biofilms and algae grow on the rocks and feed on the nutrients in the stream, essentially filtering the water. In the case of the Bakki shower, ceramic is placed in trays and the water pumped to the top of the filter and trickles through the media, eventually flowing back to the pond.

Momotaro Koi Farms developed the bakki shower with stainless steel trays. Since that time many "DIY bakki showers" have been designed with variations on them. Plastic and fiberglass boxes or crates have been used with success.

In all its simplicity there is a lot of higher chemistry going on between the bio film and the water column. The biochemistry is better explained in this book : Biology of the nitrogen cycle By Hermann Bothe, Stuart John Ferguson, William Edward Newton

== Advantages ==
The advantages of this type of filtration are:

Conversion of nitrogenous wastes
Off gassing of CO_{2} maintains pH
Oxygen is reintroduced

This method of off-gassing and aeration is used widely in aquaculture.

== Filter media choices ==
The choices of Filter media vary greatly. Each filter media has different properties and therefore different performance. Here are some photos of different types:

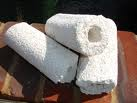
Bacteria House
