= Butterfly koi =

Breed of carp

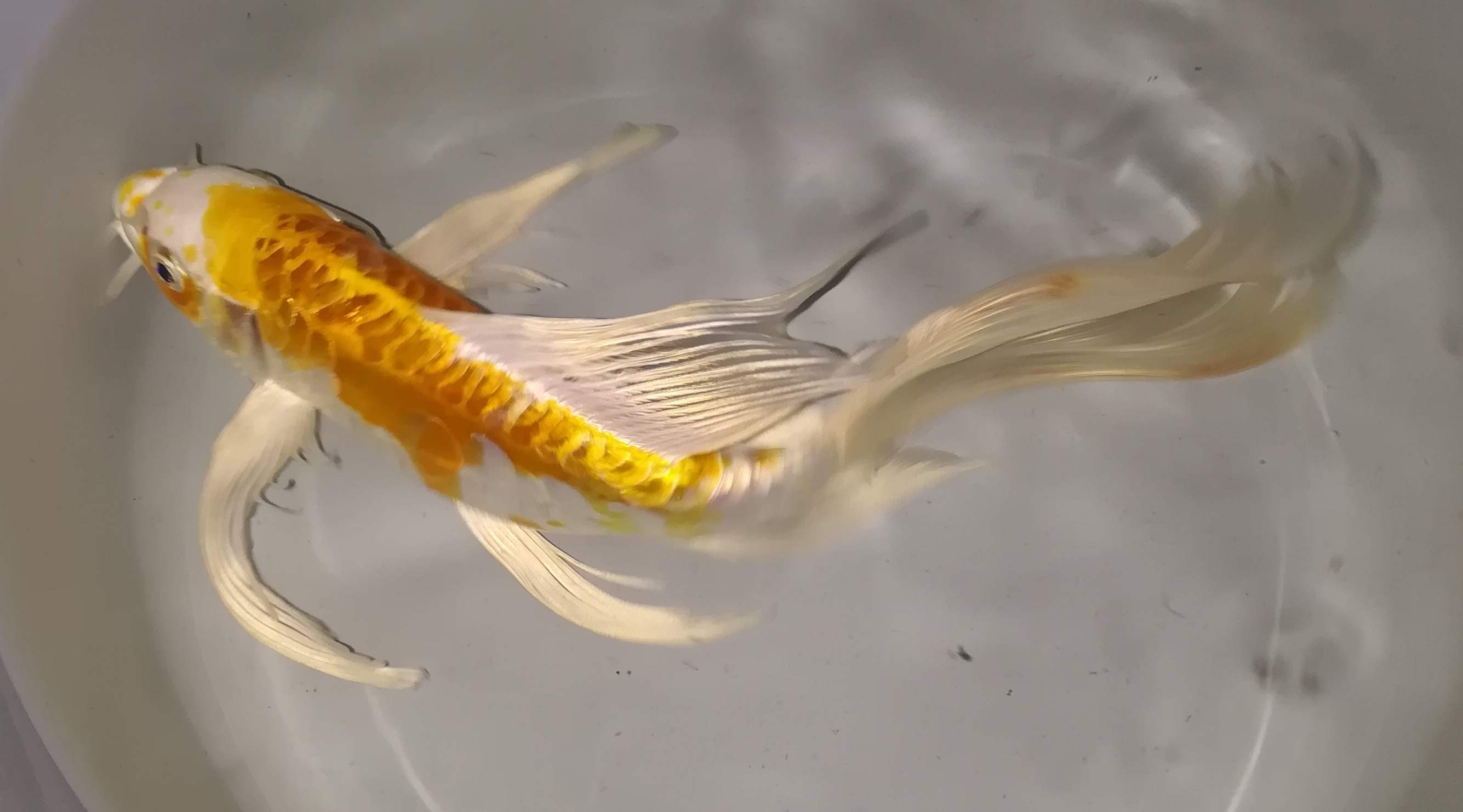
Yellow-white Butterfly Koi

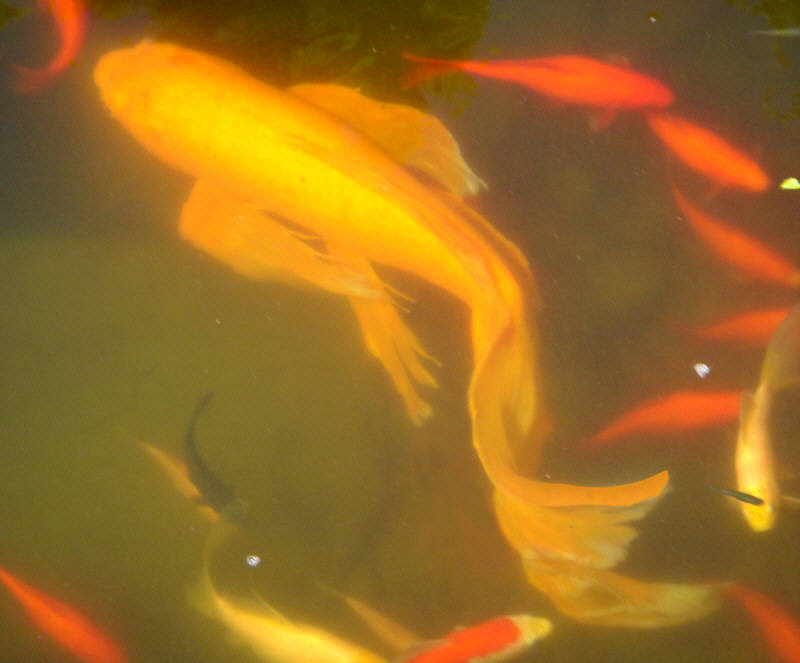
A butterfly koi, viewed from above

Butterfly koi, longfin koi, or dragon carp are a type of ornamental fish notable for their elongated finnage. The fish are a breed of the common carp, Cyprinus carpio, which includes numerous wild carp races as well as domesticated koi (nishikigoi).

In July 1977, the then Crown Prince Akihito visited the Saitama Prefectural Fisheries Experiment Station and suggested that there was a carp with a long fin in Indonesia (Cypirnus carpio var. flavipinnis C.V), and that it should be crossed with the Japanese pond smelt. This prompted the Station to start breeding koi in 1980, and two years later, this breed was born. They are still kept in a pond in the East Gardens of the Imperial Palace. These were known in Japan as onagagoi or hire naga nishikigoi, or translated in English "long tail carp". Randy LeFever, the son of Wyatt LeFever, a noted breeder of koi, is credited with suggesting they looked like butterflies, for which the breed is named. They are also sometimes referred to as dragon koi.

== Nishikigoi judging ==
Butterfly koi cannot be judged using the traditional criteria used for koi judging. The standard criteria used in these events has evolved over many years, and they are specifically tailored to rate the characteristics of koi. According to an article in KOI USA magazine, the following characteristics are largely the basis for the unsuitability of butterfly koi in traditional competition:

Conformation – The ideal shape of a koi has been set by tradition to be generously oval. By contrast, butterfly koi are naturally more slender. This difference is amplified by the fact that traditional koi judging is done from a top-down viewing angle.

Relationship of fin to body – The ratio of fin-to-body is an important scoring criteria in nishikigoi competitions. By design, longfin embody a ratio that exceeds the standards applied to nishikigoi by 500 to 1000 percent.

Pattern differences – Great energy has been given to developing butterfly koi versions of traditional koi patterns (e.g., kohaku, sanke, showa, utsuri, and ogon). Butterfly koi, however, exhibit these patterns in a slightly different way. For these reasons, Japan's Zen Nippon Airinkai ZNA (an organization that sanctions Japanese nishikigoi hobbyist competitions) have disallowed butterfly koi from competitive judging for many years; the UK Koi Judges Association also excludes these fish from competition, although their American counterpart the Associated Koi Clubs of America (AKCA) has (as of June 2006) reportedly created new standards for judging butterfly koi at future AKCA competitions. American shows that permit longfin or butterfly koi usually enter them as a variety. These entrants rarely win higher awards, however some shows feature "Best Longfin" under and over 18 inches.

== Health and Care Considerations ==
Butterfly koi are generally hardy and share similar care requirements with traditional koi varieties. However, their long fins require additional considerations. The elongated finnage is more prone to tearing, injury, and conditions such as fin rot, especially in ponds with sharp objects or poor water quality. As a result, maintaining clean water and adequate filtration is particularly important.

The extended fins can also affect swimming efficiency. Butterfly koi often exhibit slower, more flowing movement compared to standard koi, which can place them at a disadvantage in strong currents or when competing for food. This may require hobbyists to monitor feeding closely to ensure all fish are adequately nourished.

Like other koi, butterfly koi require a balanced, high-protein diet, supplemented with fresh vegetables and occasional protein treats like earthworms or shrimp. A varied diet helps support their immune system and enhances their coloration.

Under optimal conditions, butterfly koi can live 25 to 35 years or longer, similar to other koi varieties. However, their exposed fins may make them more vulnerable to parasites or injuries, so regular health checks are necessary.

Recommended pond conditions for butterfly koi are similar to those for traditional koi. A minimum water volume of 1,000 gallons per fish and a depth of at least 90 cm (3 feet) are typically recommended to ensure ample swimming space and to accommodate seasonal temperature changes.

== Popularity ==
Contrary to Japanese perception, Butterfly carp are preferred by many keepers of traditional koi who view the breed as superior to normal koi, although all koi are the result of continuous inbreeding whenever a new recessive gene showed itself over the centuries. The preference for butterfly koi by some traditional keepers may be the reason why most reputable koi retailers often sell butterfly koi, and why most of Japan's famous and prestigious breeders breed them today. Moreover, they are largely popular in Europe and Asia, and are popular with new hobbyists and in North America, where they are readily available. They can be in pet, pond, and fish keeping supply stores or preferably, specialized koi breeders. The popularity of these fish in North America has earned them the nickname, "American koi". Hence, the butterfly koi is growing in popularity worldwide.

Examples of butterfly koi are becoming more widely available as demand grows, seeing many variations in color and quality emerge.

The Butterfly has very similar feeding requirements and habits to other koi and so can be kept alongside them happily.
