= Koi =

Colored varieties of Amur carp

Koi in Japan

Several koi swim around in a pond in Japan (video).

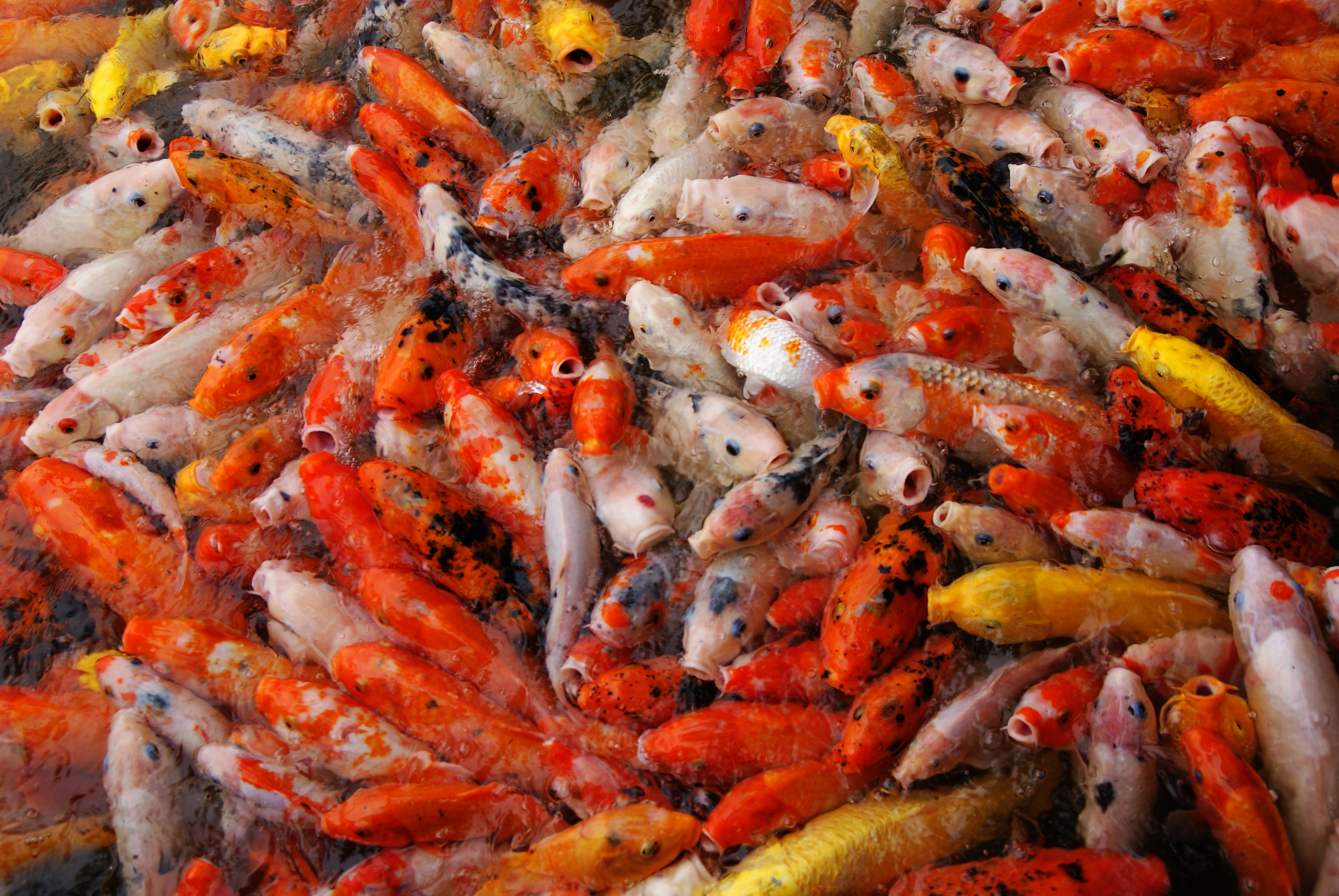
A school of koi containing multiple different varieties

Koi (Japanese: 鯉; Japanese: [koꜜi], literally 'carp'), or more specifically nishikigoi (錦鯉; Japanese: [ɲiɕi̥kiꜜɡoi], literally 'brocaded carp'), are colored varieties of carp (Cyprinus sp.) that are kept for decorative purposes in outdoor koi ponds or water gardens.

Koi is an informal name for the colored variants of carp kept for ornamental purposes. There are many varieties of ornamental koi, originating from breeding that began in Niigata, Japan, in the early 19th century.

Several varieties are recognized by Japanese breeders and owners, distinguished by coloration, patterning, and scalation. Some of the major colors are white, black, red, orange, yellow, blue, brown and cream, besides metallic shades like gold and silver-white ('platinum') scales. The most popular category of koi is the Gosanke, which is made up of the Kōhaku, Taishō Sanshoku and Shōwa Sanshoku varieties.

== History ==
Carp are a large group of fish species originally native to Central Europe and Asia. Various carp species were originally domesticated in China, where they were used primarily for consumption. Carp are coldwater fish, and their ability to survive and adapt to many climates and water conditions allowed the domesticated species to be propagated to many new locations, including Japan.

=== Prehistory ===
In Japan, Miocene fossils of the carp family (Cyprinidae) have been excavated from Iki Island, Nagasaki Prefecture. Furthermore, numerous carp pharyngeal teeth have been excavated from Jomon and Yayoi period sites. For example, pharyngeal teeth of the extinct species Jōmon Koi (Cyprinus sp.) in addition to the modern species of carp (Cyprinus carpio or Cyprinus rubrofuscus) have been excavated from the Akanoi Bay lakebed site (赤野井湾湖底遺跡) in Lake Biwa at the end of the Early Jomon Period (11,500–7,000 years ago). In addition, pharyngeal teeth of all six subfamilies of the Cyprinidae family living in Japan today, including carp (Cyprinus), have been found at the Awazu lakebed site (粟津湖底遺跡) dating from the Middle Jomon Period (5500–4400 years ago).

There are differences in the length distribution of carp excavated from Jomon and Yayoi sites, as estimated from the size of their pharyngeal teeth. Specifically, not only adult carp but also juvenile carp (less than 150 mm in length) have been found at the Yayoi site. This difference is thought to be because the Jomon only collected carp from lakes and rivers, while the Yayoi cultivated primitive carp along with the spread of rice paddies.

It was previously thought that all Japanese carp were introduced from China in prehistoric times. However, recent analysis of mitochondrial DNA revealed a significant evolutionary divergence (phylogenetic split) within common carp Cyprinus carpio between the native wild form found in Lake Biwa and the Eurasian wild form, along with domesticated varieties. This supports the idea of the ancient origin of the native Japanese form (Cyprinus sp.), as well as the East Asian ancient lineage of wild common carp (C. carpio), previously proposed on the basis of fossil data. However, it is unknown when the carp from the continent was introduced to Japan. In addition, a possible multiple origin of koi carp was indicated by the polyphyletic distribution of five mtDNA haplotypes of koi carp within the 'Eurasian' clade. Moreover, the oldest record of the introduction of non-native fish in Japan is that of goldfish from China (1502 or 1602), and there is no record of carp (including colored carp) until the introduction of the mirror carp, called Doitsugoi (German carp), in 1904.

=== Middle Ages ===
In the Japanese history book Nihon Shoki (Chronicles of Japan, 720), it is written that Emperor Keikō released carp in a pond for viewing when he visited Mino Province (present Gifu Prefecture) in the fourth year of his reign (74 CE). In Cui Bao's Gǔjīnzhù (古今注, Annotations on the Ancient and Modern Period) from the Western Jin Dynasty (4th century CE) in China, carp of the following colors are described: red horse (赤驥), blue horse (青馬), black horse (玄駒), white horse (白騏), and yellow pheasant (黄雉). In China in those days, carp were called horses because they were believed to be the vehicles of hermits and to run in the sky.

Japan's oldest drug dictionary, Fukane Sukehito's Honzō Wamyō (本草和名, 918) mentions red carp (赤鯉), blue carp (青鯉), black carp (黒鯉), white carp (白鯉), and yellow carp (黄鯉) as Japanese names corresponding to the above Chinese names, suggesting that carp of these colors existed in China and Japan in those days. In addition, Hitomi Hitsudai's drug dictionary Honchō Shokkan (本朝食鑑, Japanese Medicine Encyclopedia, 1697) states that red, yellow, and white carp of the three colors were in Japan at that time.

However, it is believed that these single-colored carp were not a variety created by artificial selection, as is the case with today's koi, but rather a mutation-induced color change. In ancient times, carp was farmed primarily for food. Mutational color variation in carp is relatively common in nature, but is not suitable for development alongside farming for food in poor rural communities; color inheritance is unstable and selection to maintain color variation is costly. For example, in current-day farming of koi as ornamental fish, the percentage of superior colored fish to the number of spawn is less than 1%.

The Amur carp (Cyprinus rubrofuscus) is a member of the cyprinid family species complex native to East Asia. Amur carp were previously identified as a subspecies of the common carp (as C. c. haematopterus), but recent authorities treat it as a separate species under the name C. rubrofuscus. Amur carp have been aquacultured as a food fish at least as long ago as the fifth century BCE in China.

=== Modern period ===
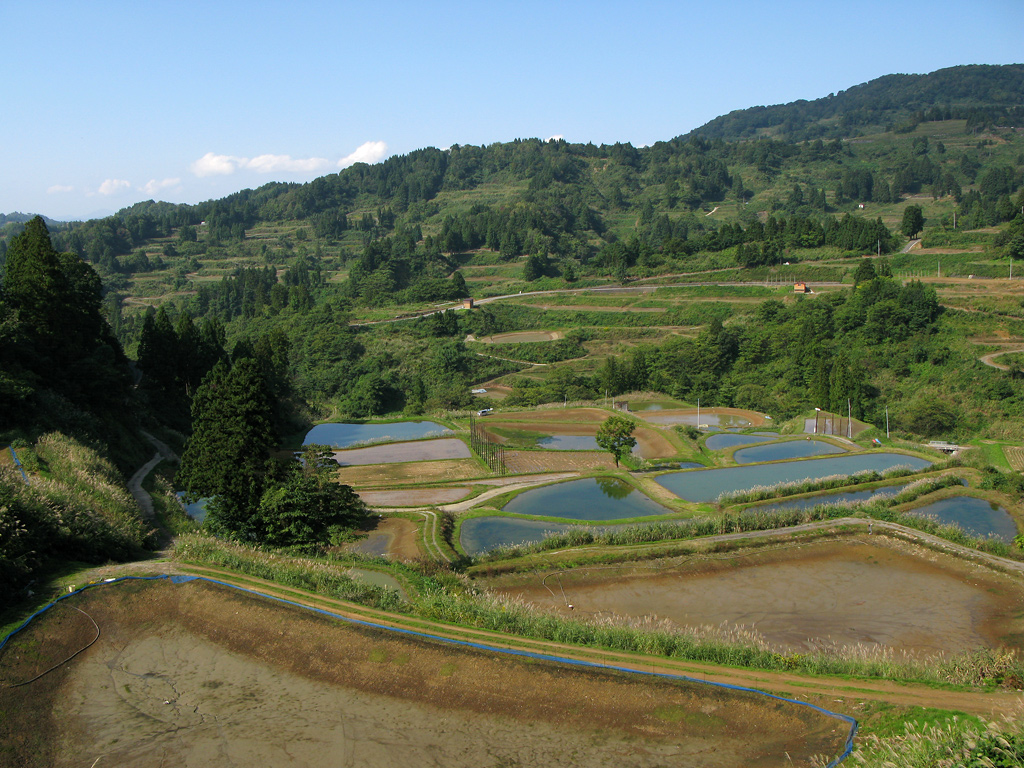
Terraced rice paddies in Yamakoshi, Niigata Prefecture

The systematic breeding of ornamental Amur carp began in the 1820s in an area known as "Nijūmuragō" (二十村郷, lit. 'twenty villages') which spans Ojiya and Yamakoshi in Niigata Prefecture (located on the northeastern coast of Honshu) in Japan. In Niigata Prefecture, Amur carp were farmed for food in Musubu Shinden, Kanbara County (present Akiba Ward, Niigata City) from the end of the Genna era (1615–1624). In the Nijūmuragō area, carp were also farmed in terraced ponds near terraced rice paddies by 1781 at the latest, but the ponds ran dry due to a severe drought that occurred around that time, and the carp escaped the disaster by taking refuge in ponds on the grounds of Senryu Shrine in Higashiyama Village and Juni Shrine in Higashitakezawa Village.

During the Bunka and Bunsei eras (1804–1830), people in the Nijūmuragō area bred red and white koi in addition to black koi, and crossed them to produce red and white colored koi. After that, they further crossed them and perfected them.

Around 1875, colored koi became popular and the number of breeders increased, and some expensive koi were produced, but Niigata Prefecture banned the aquaculture of ornamental koi because it was considered a speculative business, and the business suffered a major blow for a time. However, the ban was lifted soon after, thanks to the petition of the villagers. At that time, colored koi included Kōhaku, Asagi, Ki Utsuri, etc. From this original handful of koi varieties, all other Nishikigoi varieties were bred, with the exception of the Ogon variety (single-colored, metallic koi), which was developed relatively recently.

Koi breeding flourished in the Nijūmuragō area for two reasons: 1) the custom of raising koi in fallow fields for emergency food during the winter, and 2) the existence of many inden (隠田), or hidden rice fields in the mountains, unknown to the lord, which allowed the farmers to avoid taxes and become relatively wealthy. Breeding of koi was promoted as a hobby of farmers who could afford it, and high-quality individuals came to be bought and sold.

The name Nishikigoi (brocaded carp) did not exist until the 1910s. Before that time, Nishikigoi were called Madaragoi (斑鯉, lit. 'spotted carp'), Kawarigoi (変鯉, lit. 'variant carp'), Irogoi (色鯉, lit. 'colored carp'), Moyōgoi (模様鯉, lit. 'patterned carp'), and so on.

A geographical book on Suruga Province (present-day Shizuoka Prefecture), Abe Masanobu's Sunkoku Zasshi (1843), mentions that in addition to Asagi, purple, red, and white carp, there are "spotted carp (also known as Bekko carp)." This probably refers to two- or three-colored carp caused by mutation, and is a valuable record of Nishikigoi of the Edo period (1603–1868).

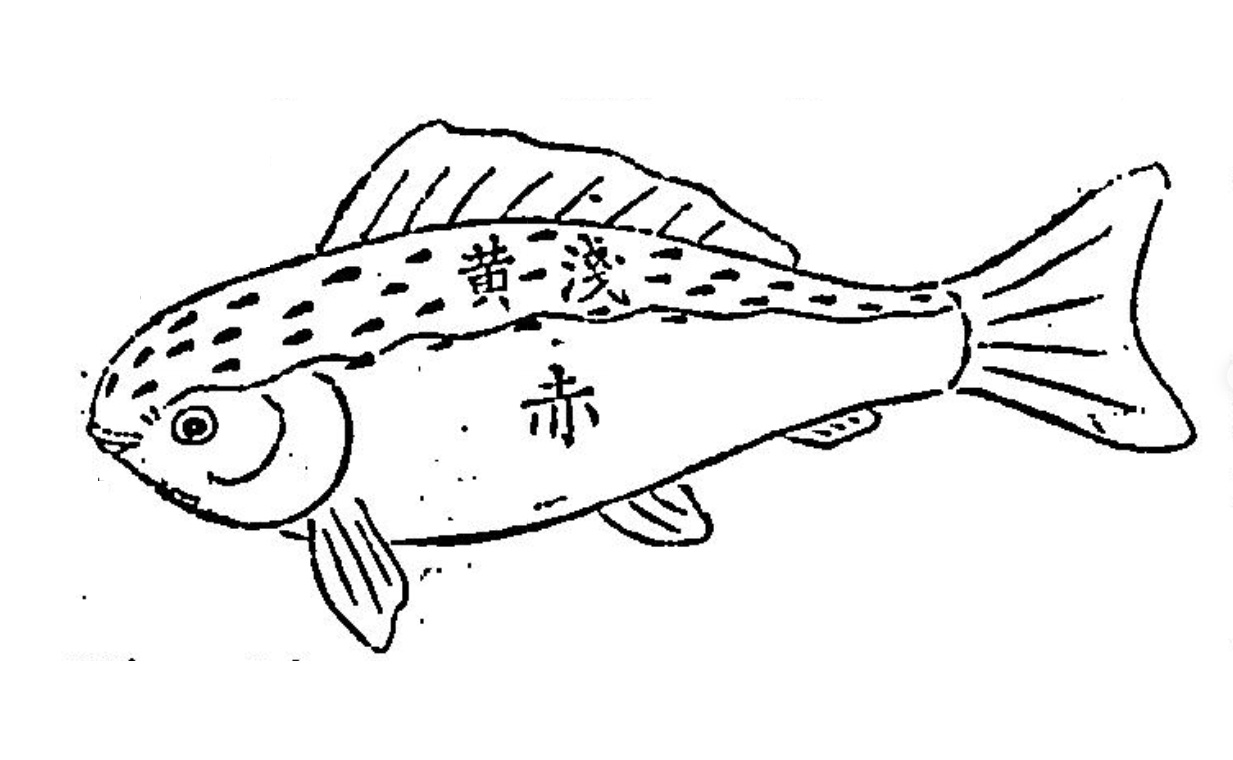
Illustration of a three-colored carp in Ritsurin Garden, 1900. This is the oldest illustration of koi. It has the annotations asagi on its back and red on its belly.

In 1900, there was a three-colored carp in Ritsurin Garden in Takamatsu, Kagawa Prefecture, and the price was over 1,000 yen per fish, which was a high price for that time. The three-colored carp had a red belly and asagi (light blue) back with black spots, and is thought to have been a mutation similar to today's Asagi koi.

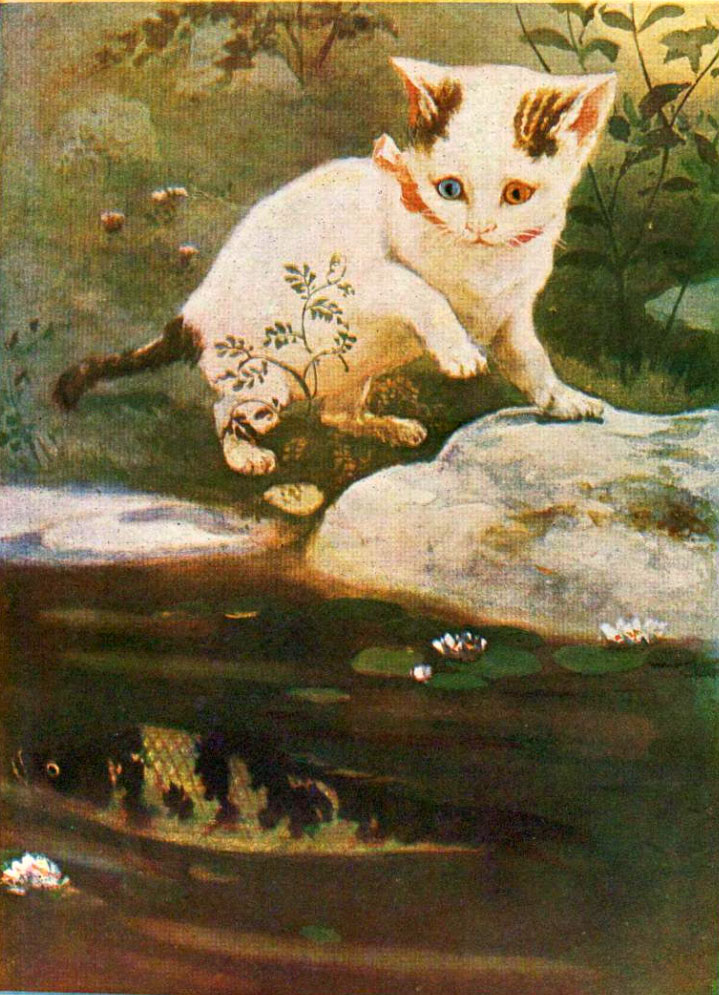
Odd-eyed cat and Spotted carp, from the magazine Shonen, 1910

The magazine "Shonen" (1910) introduced Nishikigoi under the name of Madaragoi (spotted carp) or Kawarigoi (variant carp), and said that even skilled fish breeders did not know how they could produce Nishikigoi, but only waited for them to be produced by chance. The price of Nishikigoi at a fish show in Fukagawa, Tokyo, was 100 to 150 yen per fish, which was "extremely expensive" at the time. Therefore, even at that time, mutant Nishikigoi were known to some fish breeders and hobbyists in Tokyo, but artificial breeds such as Nijūmuragō's Nishikigoi were still unknown to the general public.

In 1914, when the Tokyo Taishō Exposition was held, the "Koi Exhibit Association" was formed mainly by koi breeders in Higashiyama and Takezawa villages, and koi were exhibited. At the time, they were still called "colored carp" or "patterned carp," and they were described as "the first of their kind ever seen in the Tokyo area." And the koi received much attention, winning a silver medal. After the exposition closed, they presented eight koi to the Crown Prince (Emperor Showa). This exhibition triggered an expansion of sales channels, and the market value of koi soared.

In 1917, the Taishō Sanshoku (by Eizaburo Hoshino) was fixed as a breed. The name Nishikigoi is said to have been given by Kei Abe, who was the chief fisheries officer of the Niigata Prefectural Government in the Taisho era (1912–1926), after he admired the Taishō Sanshoku when he first saw it. In 1917, the fixation of Kōhaku (by Kunizo Hiroi), which had first been produced in the 1880s, was also assured.

Apart from the koi of Niigata Prefecture's Nijūmuragō area, there is a variety called Shūsui (秋翠), which was created by Tokyo-based goldfish breeder Kichigoro Akiyama in 1906 by crossing a female leather carp imported from Germany with a male Japanese Asagi or spotted carp. The leather carp is a low scaled variety bred in 1782 in Austria, and was sent to Japan from Munich, Germany in 1904, along with the mirror carp, which also has few scales. In Japan, these two varieties are called Doitsugoi (German carp), and Shūsui and its lineage are also called Doitsu or Doitsugoi in koi.

In 1927, Shōwa Sanshoku (by Shigekichi Hoshino) was fixed as a breed, and in 1939, koi were exhibited at the Japanese pavilion at the Golden Gate International Exposition held in San Francisco.

=== Today ===
The hobby of keeping koi eventually spread worldwide. They are sold in many pet aquarium shops, with higher-quality fish available from specialist dealers. Collecting koi has become a social hobby. Passionate hobbyists join clubs, share their knowledge and help each other with their koi. In particular, since the 21st century, affluent people often from other Asian countries have imported large quantities of koi from Niigata in Japan, and the price of high-quality carp has soared. In 2018, one carp was bought by a Chinese collector for about $2 million, the highest price ever. There are also cases in which purchased carp are bred in China and sold to foreign countries, and many breeds are spreading all over the world.

== Etymology ==
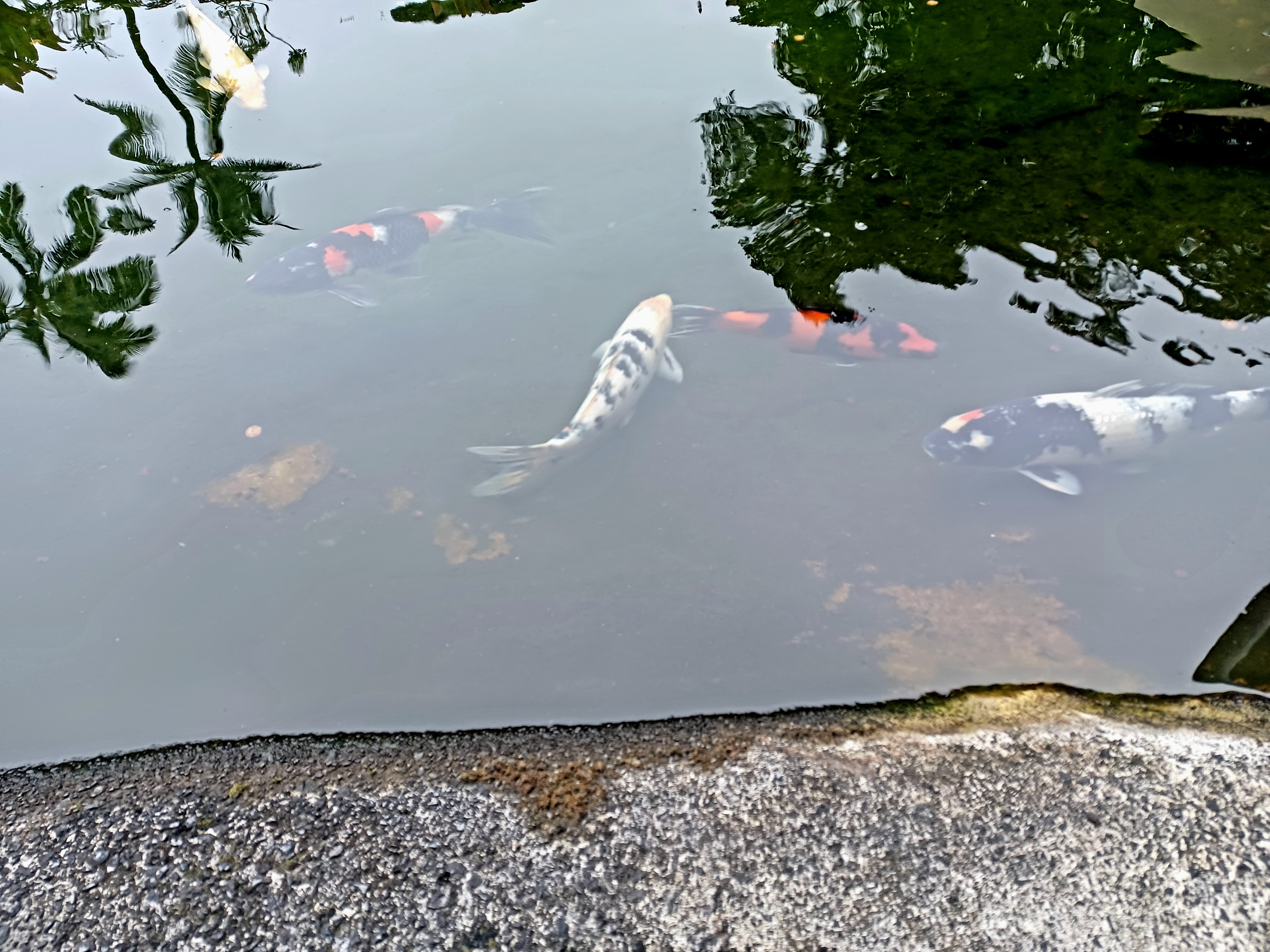
Koi in an artificial pond at a hotel in Hilo

The words koi and nishikigoi come from the Japanese words 鯉 'carp', and 錦鯉 'brocaded carp', respectively. In Japanese, 'koi' is a homophone for 恋, another word that means 'affection' or 'love', so koi are symbols of love and friendship in Japan.

Colored ornamental carp were originally called Irokoi (色鯉) meaning 'colored carp', Hanakoi (花鯉) meaning 'floral carp', and Moyōkoi (模様鯉) meaning patterned carp. There are various theories as to how these words came to be disused, in favor of Nishikigoi (錦鯉), which is used today. One theory holds that, during World War II, the words Irokoi and Hanakoi (which can have sexual meanings) were changed to Nishikigoi because they were not suitable for the social situation of war. Another theory is that Nishikigoi, which was the original name for the popular Taishō Sanshoku variety, gradually became the term used for all ornamental koi.

== Genetic origins and taxonomy ==
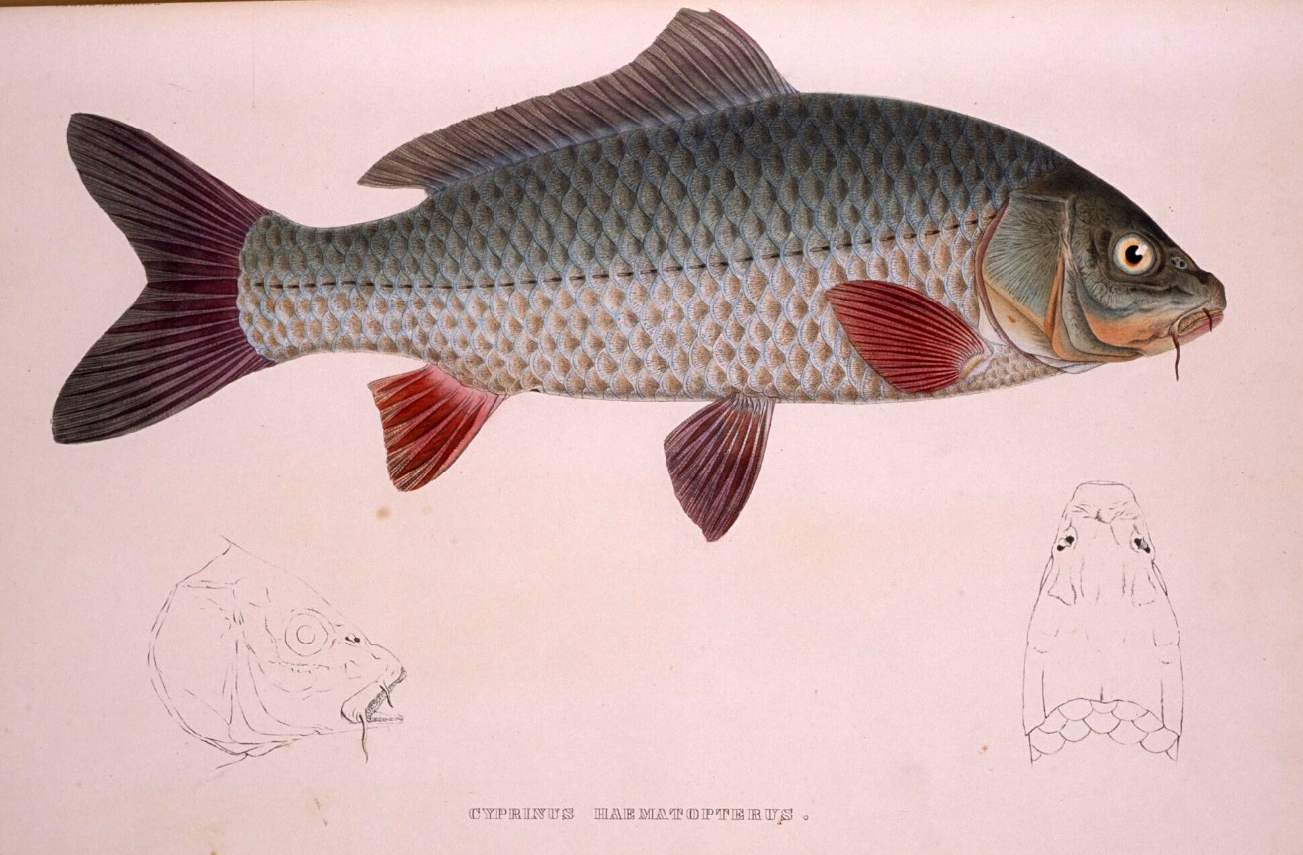
Cyprinus haematopterus

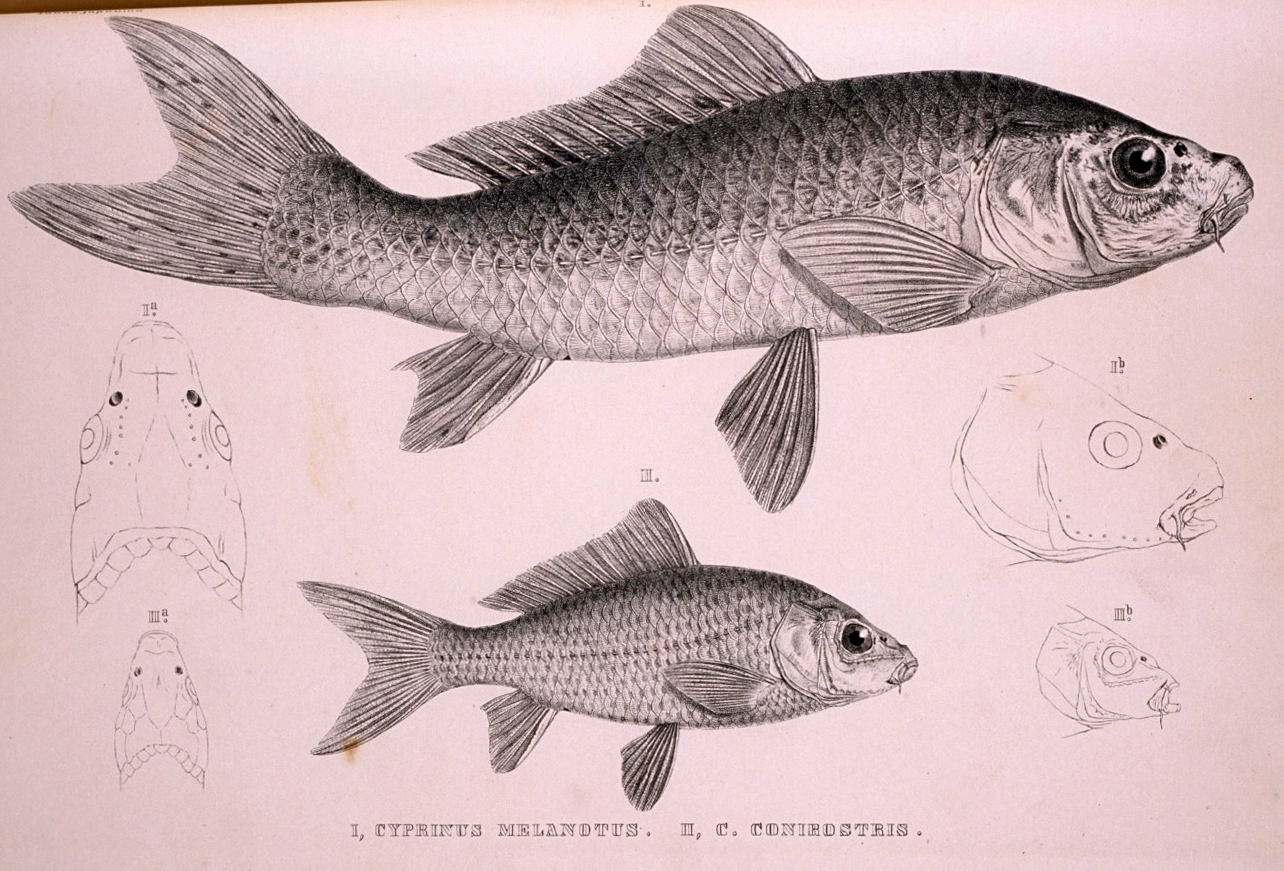
Cyprinus melanotus and Cyprinus conirostris

The koi are a group of breeds produced by artificial selection primarily from black carp called nogoi (野鯉, lit. 'wild carp') or magoi (真鯉, lit. 'true carp'), which inhabit lakes, ponds, and rivers in Japan. The black carp refers to the Eurasian carp (Cyprinus carpio), which was previously thought to have been introduced to Japan from Eurasia in prehistoric times.

Philipp Franz von Siebold of the Netherlands, who stayed in Japan during the Edo period, reported in Fauna Japonica (1833–1850) that there were three species of carp in Japan: Cyprinus haematopterus, Cyprinus melanotus, and Cyprinus conirostris. This classification has not received much attention until recently, and it was thought that only one species of carp existed in Japan. However, recent analysis of mitochondrial DNA has revealed that there are at least two species of carp in Japan: native carp and carp from Eurasia. Currently, the Japanese native carp is assumed to be Cyprinus melanotus, and a new scientific name for it is being considered.

Cyprinus haematopterus is thought to refer to the Amur carp of Eurasian origin, traditionally called Yamatogoi (大和鯉, lit. 'carp of Yamato Province') in Japan. Yamatogoi have been famous since the Edo period as farmed carp in Yamato Province (now Nara Prefecture). Other carp of the same type as Yamatogoi are known as Yodogoi (淀鯉, Yodo River carp) from Osaka and Shinshūgoi (信州鯉, introduced Yodogoi) from Nagano Prefecture. These carp were famous for their delicious taste. Since the Meiji period, Yamatogoi have been released into lakes and rivers throughout Japan, causing genetic contamination with native carp and making research on the origin of the Japanese carp difficult. Koi is thought to be primarily of this Yamatogoi (Amur carp) lineage, but it also carries some genes of the native Japanese carp.

In the past, koi were commonly believed to have been bred from the common carp (Cyprinus carpio). Extensive hybridization between different populations, coupled with widespread translocations, has muddled the historical zoogeography of the common carp and its relatives. Traditionally, Amur carp (C. rubrofuscus) were considered a subspecies of the common carp, often under the scientific name C. carpio haematopterus. However, they differ in meristics from the common carp of Europe and Western Asia, leading recent authorities to recognize them as a separate species, C. rubrofuscus (C. c. haematopterus being a junior synonym). Although one study of mitochondrial DNA (mtDNA) was unable to find a clear genetic structure matching the geographic populations (possibly because of translocation of carp from separate regions), others based on mtDNA, microsatellite DNA and genomic DNA found a clear separation between the European/West Asian population and the East Asian population, with koi belonging in the latter. Consequently, recent authorities have suggested that the ancestral species of the koi is C. rubrofuscus (syn. C. c. haematopterus) or at least an East Asian carp species instead of C. carpio. Regardless, a taxonomic review of Cyprinus carp from eastern and southeastern Asia may be necessary, as the genetic variations do not fully match the currently recognized species pattern, with one study of mtDNA suggesting that koi are close to the Southeast Asian carp, but not necessarily the Chinese.

== Varieties ==
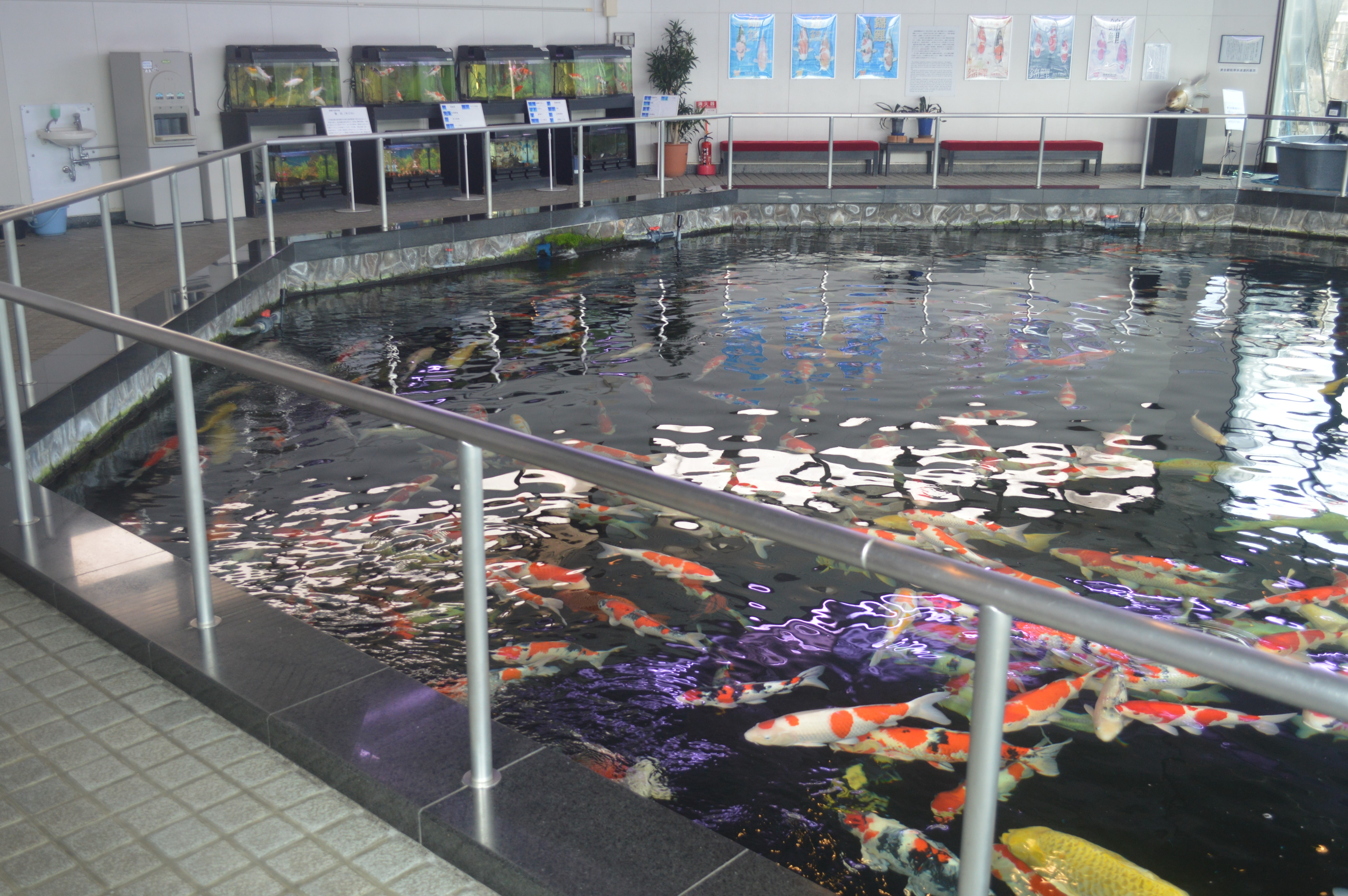
The Ojiya no Sato Museum in Niigata Prefecture, Japan, is the only museum in the world that exhibits both varieties of living koi and data that show the history of their breeding.

According to Zen Nippon Airinkai, a group that leads the breeding and dissemination of koi in Japan, there are more than 100 varieties of koi created through breeding, and each variety is classified into 16 groups. Koi varieties are distinguished by coloration, patterning, and scalation. Some of the major colors are white, black, red, yellow, blue, and cream. Metallic shades of gold and platinum in the scales have also been developed through selective breeding. Although the possible colors are virtually limitless, breeders have identified and named a number of specific categories. The most notable category is Gosanke (御三家), which is made up of the Kōhaku, Taishō Sanshoku, and Shōwa Sanshoku varieties.

New koi varieties are still being actively developed. Ghost koi developed in the 1980s have become very popular in the United Kingdom; they are a hybrid of wild carp and Ogon koi and are distinguished by their metallic scales. Butterfly koi (also known as longfin koi, or dragon carp), also developed in the 1980s, are notable for their long and flowing fins. They are hybrids of koi with Asian carp. Butterfly koi and ghost koi are considered by some to be not true nishikigoi.

The major named varieties include:

- Kōhaku (紅白) is a white-skinned koi, with large red markings on the top. The name means "red and white"; kōhaku was one of the first ornamental varieties to be established in Japan (late 19th century).
- Taishō Sanshoku (or Taishō Sanke) (大正三色) is very similar to the kōhaku, except for the addition of small black markings called sumi (墨). This variety was first exhibited in 1914 by the koi breeder Gonzo Hiroi, during the reign of the Taishō Emperor. In the United States, the name is often abbreviated to just "Sanke". The kanji, 三色, may be read as either sanshoku or as sanke (from its earlier name 三毛).
- Shōwa Sanshoku (or Shōwa Sanke) (昭和三色) is a black koi with red (hi 緋) and white (shiroji 白地) markings. The first Shōwa Sanke was exhibited in 1927, during the reign of the Shōwa Emperor. In America, the name is often abbreviated to just "Shōwa". The amount of shiroji on Shōwa Sanke has increased in modern times (Kindai Shōwa 近代昭和), to the point that it can be difficult to distinguish from Taishō Sanke. The kanji, 三色, may be read as either sanshoku or as sanke.
- Bekkō (鼈甲、べっ甲) is a white-, red-, or yellow-skinned koi with black markings sumi (墨). The Japanese name means "tortoise shell", and is commonly written as 鼈甲. The white, red, and yellow varieties are called Shiro Bekkō (白鼈甲), Aka Bekkō (赤鼈甲) and Ki Bekkō (黄鼈甲), respectively. It may be confused with the Utsuri.
- Utsurimono (写り物) is a black koi with white, red, or yellow markings, in a zebra color pattern. The oldest attested form is the yellow form, called "black and yellow markings" (黒黄斑, Kuro ki madara) in the 19th century, but renamed Ki Utsuri (黄写り) by Elizaburo Hoshino, an early 20th-century koi breeder. The red and white versions are called Hi Utsuri (緋写り) and Shiro Utsuri (白写り) (piebald color morph), respectively. The word utsuri means to print (the black markings are reminiscent of ink stains). Genetically, it is the same as Shōwa, but lacking either red pigment (Shiro Utsuri) or white pigment (Hi Utsuri/Ki Utsuri).
- Asagi (浅黄) koi is light blue above and usually red below, but also occasionally pale yellow or cream, generally below the lateral line and on the cheeks. The Japanese name means pale greenish-blue, spring onion color, or indigo.
- Shūsui (秋翠) means "autumn green"; the Shūsui was created in 1910 by Yoshigoro Akiyama, by crossing Japanese Asagi with German mirror carp. The fish has no scales, except for a single line of large mirror scales dorsally, extending from head to tail. The most common type of Shūsui has a pale, sky-blue/gray color above the lateral line and red or orange (and very, very rarely bright yellow) below the lateral line and on the cheeks.
- Koromo (衣) is a white fish with a Kōhaku-style pattern with blue or black-edged scales only over the hi pattern. This variety first arose in the 1950s as a cross between a Kōhaku and an Asagi. The most commonly encountered Koromo is an Ai Goromo (藍衣), which is colored like a Kōhaku, except each of the scales within the red patches has a blue or black edge to it. Less common is the Budō-Goromo (葡萄衣), which has a darker (burgundy) hi overlay that gives it the appearance of bunches of grapes. Very rarely seen is the Sumi-Goromo (墨衣), which is similar to Budō-Goromo, but the hi pattern is such a dark burgundy that it appears nearly black.
- Kawarimono (変わり物) is a "catch-all" term for koi that cannot be put into one of the other categories. This is a competition category, and many new varieties of koi compete in this one category. It is also known as kawarigoi (変わり鯉).
- Goshiki (五色) is a dark koi with red (Kōhaku style) hi pattern. The Japanese name means "five colors". It appears similar to an Asagi, with little or no hi below the lateral line and a Kōhaku Hi pattern over reticulated (fishnet pattern) scales. The base color can range from nearly black to very pale, sky blue.
- Hikari-mujiimono (光無地もの) is a variety of which the whole body is one color and the body is shiny, and it is called differently depending on the color.
- Hikari-moyomono (光模樣もの) is a koi with colored markings over a metallic base or in two metallic colors.
- Hikari-utsurimono (光写りもの) is a cross between utsurimono series and Ōgon.
- Kinginrin (金銀鱗) is a koi with metallic (glittering, metal-flake-appearing) scales. The name translates into English as "gold and silver scales"; it is often abbreviated to Ginrin. Ginrin versions of almost all other varieties of koi occur, and they are fashionable. Their sparkling, glittering scales contrast to the smooth, even, metallic skin and scales seen in the Ogon varieties. Recently, these characteristics have been combined to create the new ginrin Ogon varieties.
- Tanchō (丹頂) is any koi with a solitary red patch on its head. The fish may be a Tanchō Shōwa, Tanchō Sanke, or even Tanchō Goshiki. It is named for the Japanese red-crowned crane (Grus japonensis), which also has a red spot on its head.
- Chagoi (茶鯉), "tea-colored", this koi can range in color from pale olive-drab green or brown to copper or bronze and more recently, darker, subdued orange shades. Famous for its docile, friendly personality and large size, it is considered a sign of good luck among koi keepers.
- Ōgon (黄金) is a metallic koi of one color only (hikarimono 光者). The most commonly encountered colors are gold, platinum, and orange. Cream specimens are very rare. Ōgon compete in the Kawarimono category and the Japanese name means "gold". The variety was created by Sawata Aoki in 1946 from wild carp he caught in 1921.
- Kumonryū (九紋竜, literally "nine tattooed dragons") is a black doitsu-scaled fish with curling white markings. The patterns are thought to be reminiscent of Japanese ink paintings of dragons. They famously change color with the seasons. Kumonryu compete in the Kawarimono category.
- Ochiba (落葉) is a light blue/gray koi with copper, bronze, or yellow (Kohaku-style) pattern, reminiscent of autumn leaves on water. The Japanese name means "fallen leaves".
- Kikokuryū (輝黒竜, literally "sparkle" or "glitter black dragon") is a metallic-skinned version of the Kumonryu.
- Kin-Kikokuryū (金輝黒竜, literally "gold sparkle black dragon" or "gold glitter black dragon") is a metallic-skinned version of the Kumonryu with a Kōhaku-style hi pattern developed by Mr. Seiki Igarashi of Ojiya City. At least six different genetic subvarieties of this general variety are seen.
- Ghost koi (人面魚、じんめんぎょ), a hybrid of Ōgon and wild carp with metallic scales, is considered by some to be not nishikigoi.
- Butterfly koi (鰭長錦鯉、ひれながにしきごい) is a hybrid of koi and Asian carp with long flowing fins. Various colorations depend on the koi stock used to cross. It also is considered by some to not be nishikigoi.
- Doitsu-goi (ドイツ鯉) originated by crossbreeding numerous different established varieties with "scaleless" German carp (generally, fish with only a single line of scales along each side of the dorsal fin). Also written as 独逸鯉, four main types of Doitsu scale patterns exist. The most common type (referred to above) has a row of scales beginning at the front of the dorsal fin and ending at the end of the dorsal fin (along both sides of the fin). The second type has a row of scales beginning where the head meets the shoulder and running the entire length of the fish (along both sides). The third type is the same as the second, with the addition of a line of (often quite large) scales running along the lateral line (along the side) of the fish, also referred to as "mirror koi". The fourth (and rarest) type is referred to as "armor koi" and is completely (or nearly) covered with very large scales that resemble plates of armor. It also is called Kagami-goi (鏡鯉、カガミゴイ), or mirror carp (ミラーカープ).
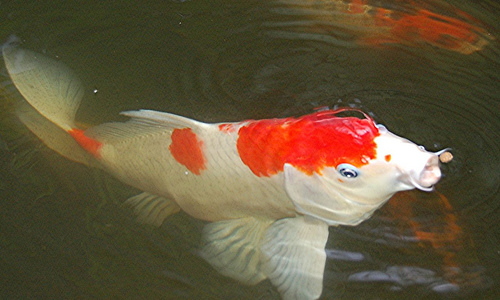
Kōhaku

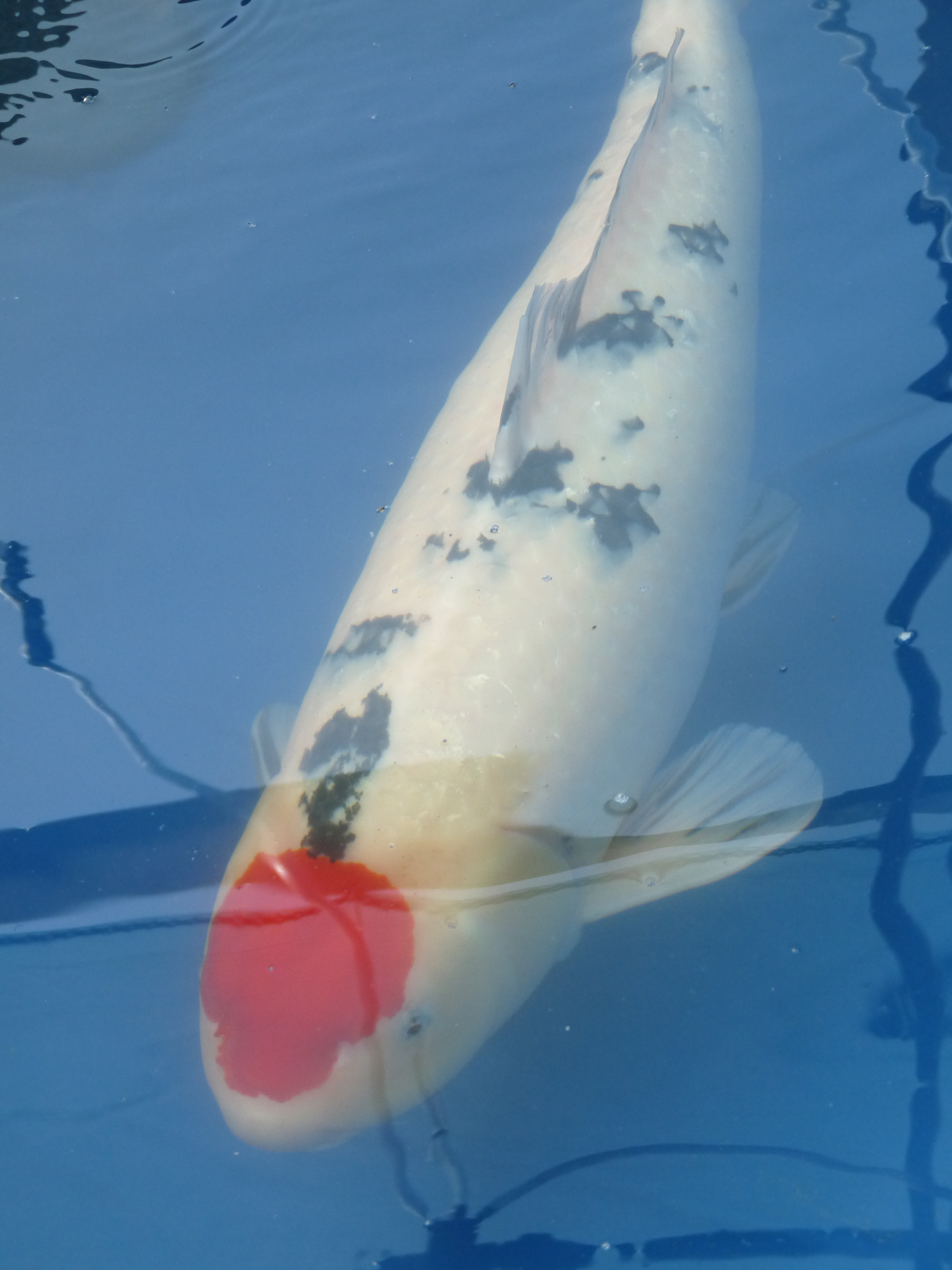
Tanchō Sanke

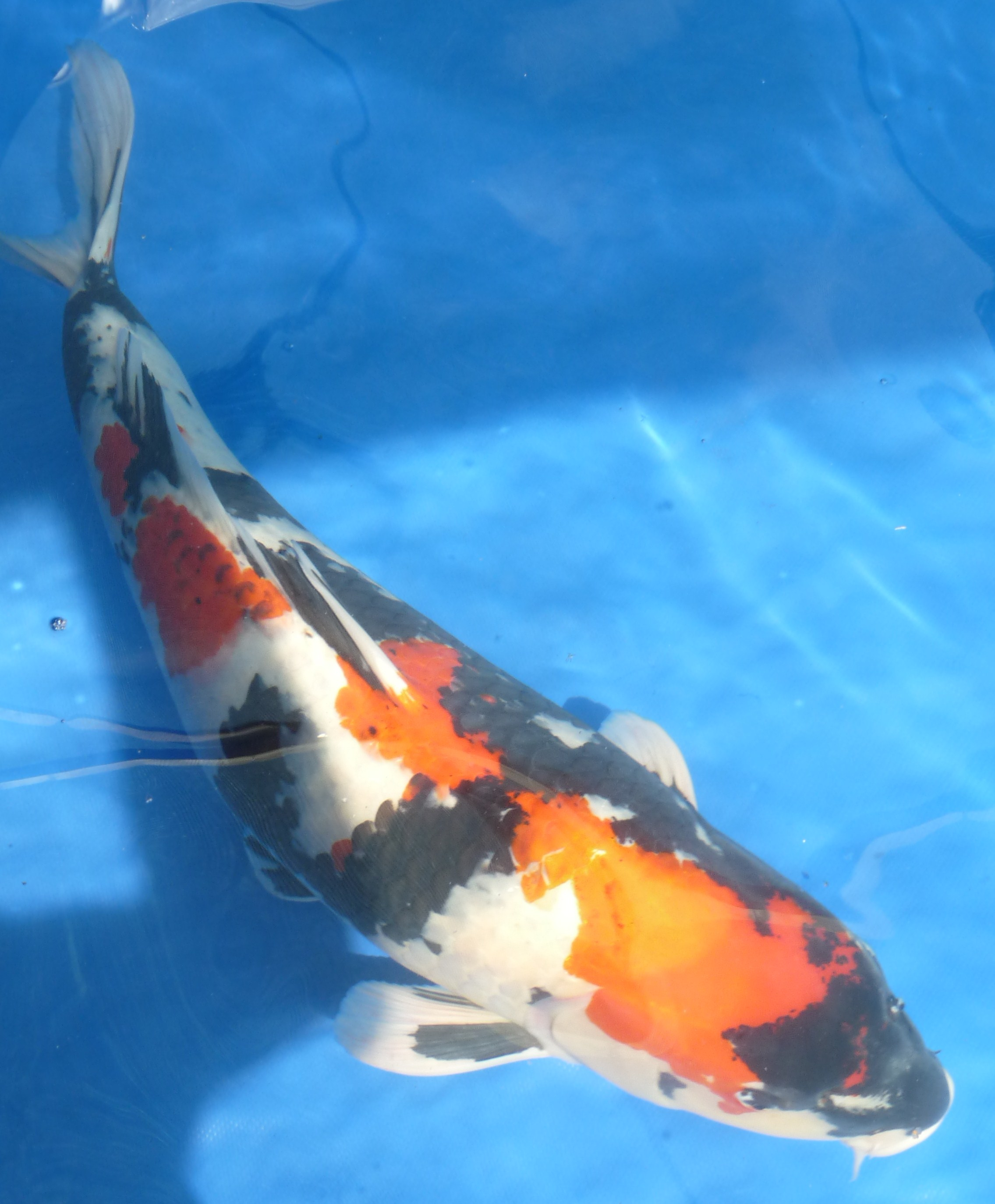
Shōwa Sanke

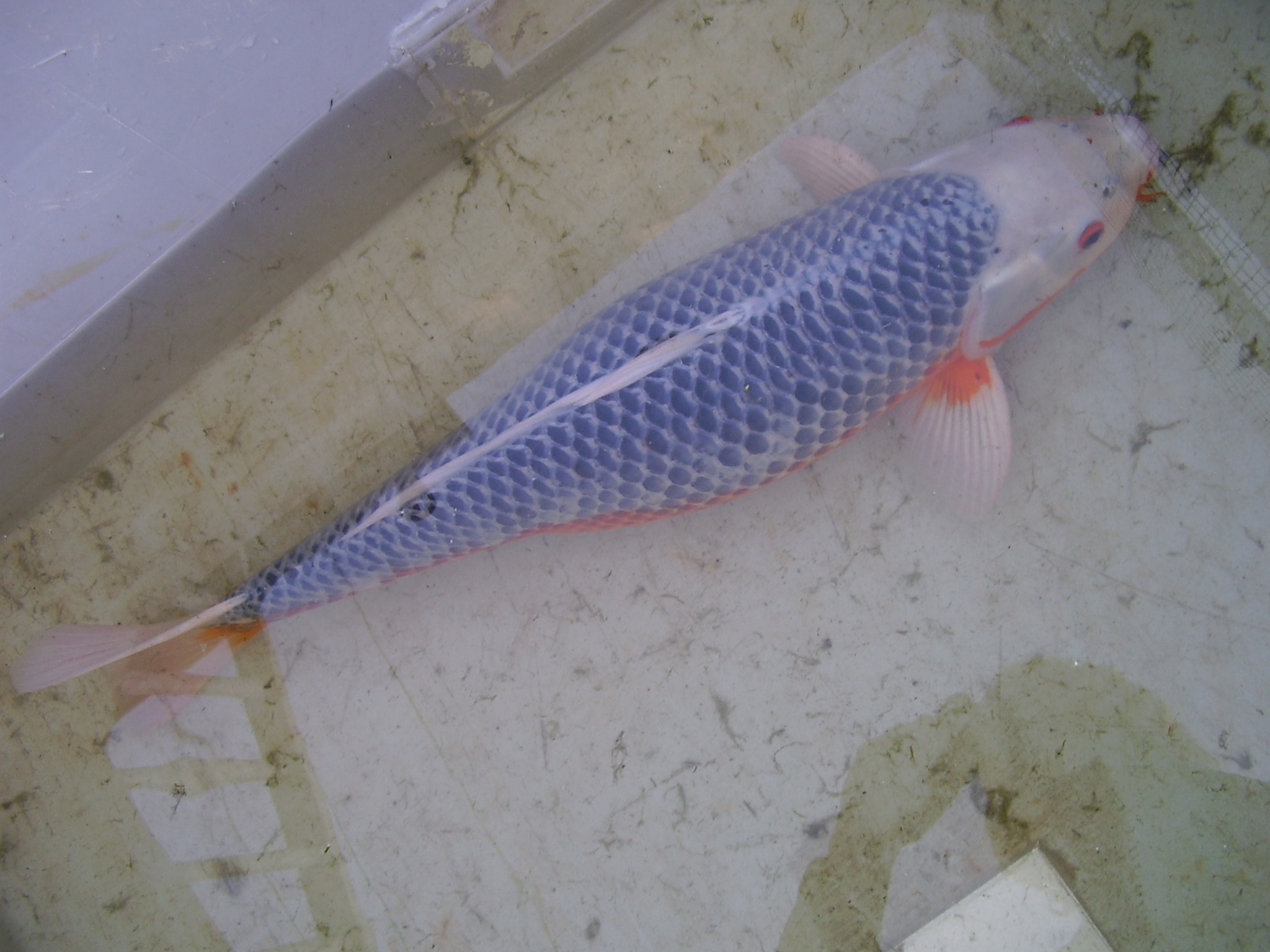
Asagi

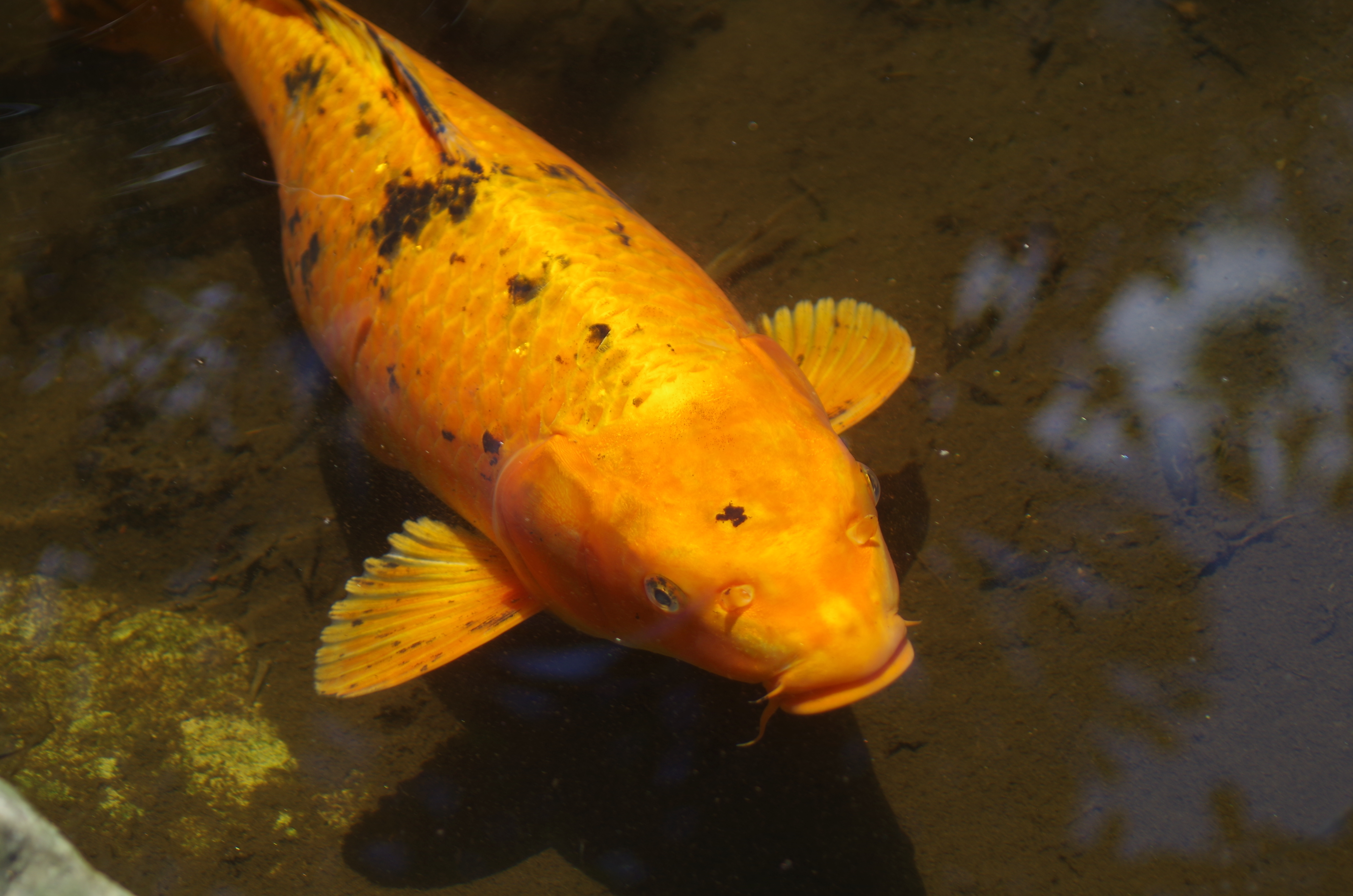
Bekkō

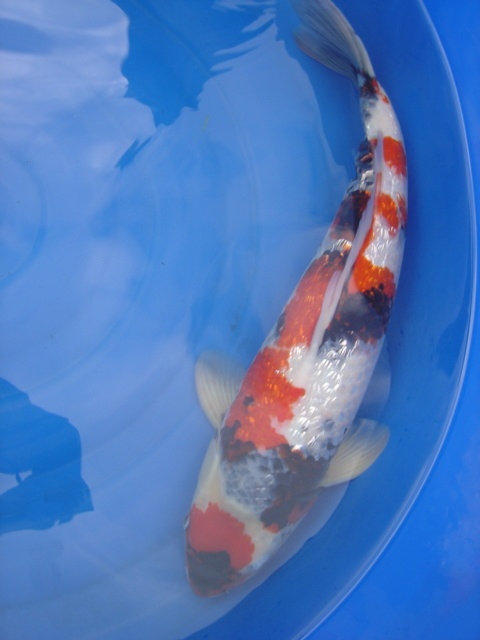
Gin Rin Shōwa

== Differences from goldfish ==
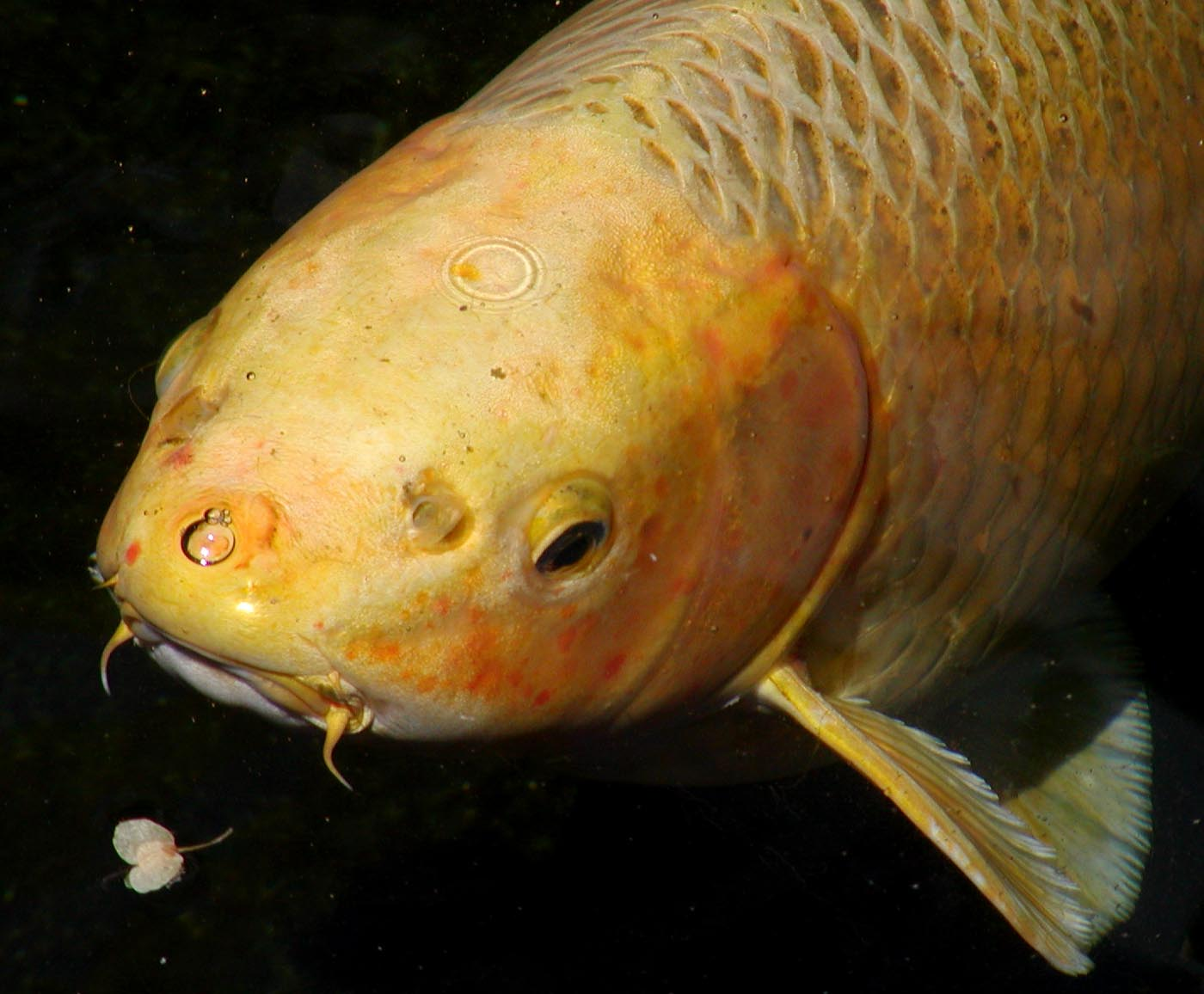
Koi have prominent barbels on the lip that are not visible in goldfish.

Goldfish (Carassius auratus) were developed in China more than a thousand years ago by selectively breeding colored varieties; by the Song dynasty (960–1279), yellow, orange, white, and red-and-white colorations had been developed. Goldfish were introduced to Japan in the 16th century and to Europe in the 17th century. On the other hand, most ornamental koi breeds currently distributed worldwide originate from Amur carp (Cyprinus rubrofuscus) bred in Japan in the first half of the 19th century. Koi are domesticated Amur carp that are selected or culled for color; they are not a different species, and will revert to the original coloration within a few generations if allowed to breed freely.

Some goldfish varieties, such as the common goldfish, comet goldfish, and shubunkin, have body shapes and coloration that are similar to koi, and can be difficult to tell apart from koi when immature. Goldfish and koi can interbreed; however, as they were developed from different species of carp, their offspring are sterile.

== Health, maintenance, and longevity ==
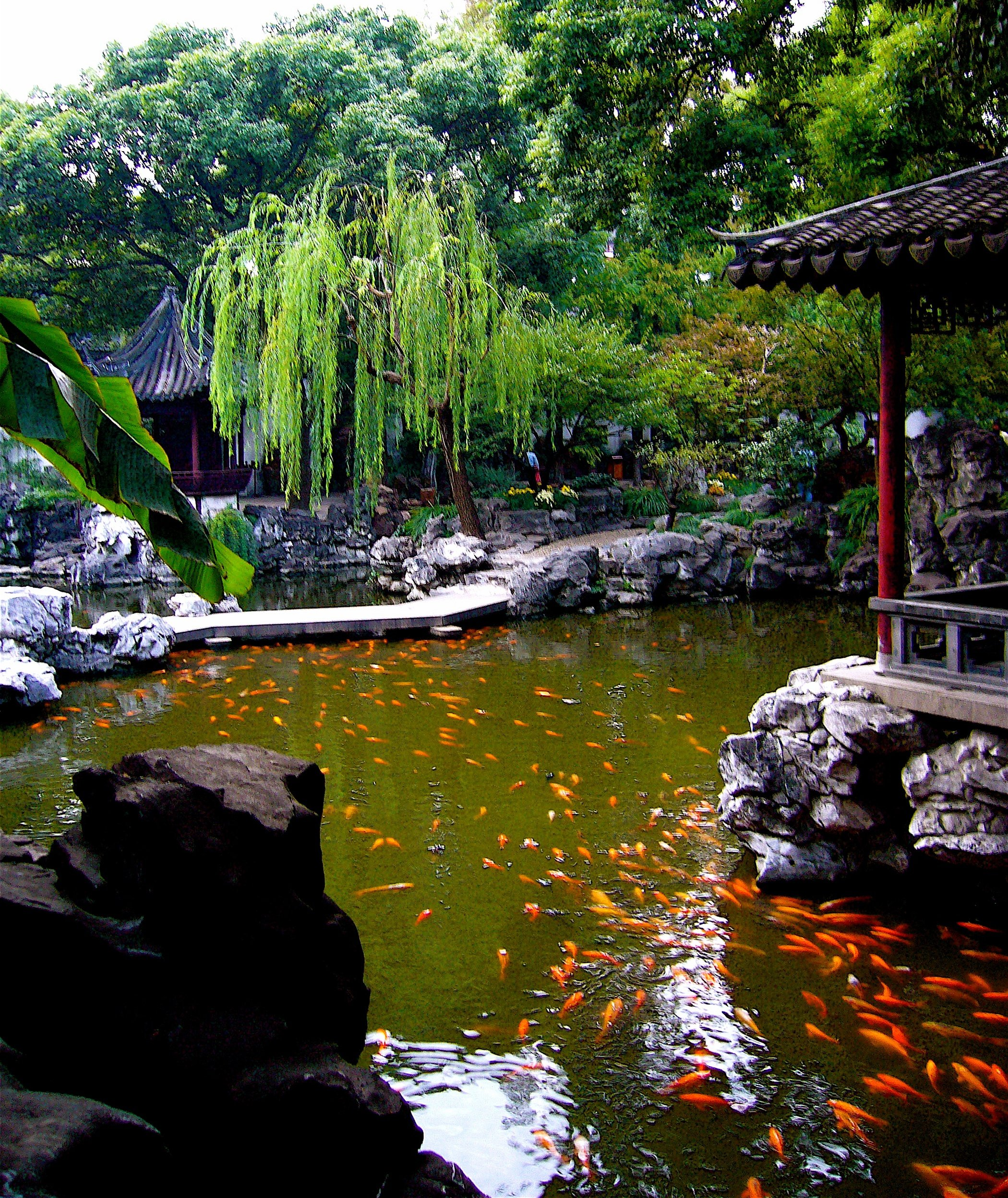
Koi in Yu Garden, Shanghai

The Amur carp is a hardy fish, and koi retain that durability. Koi are coldwater fish, but benefit from being kept in the 15–25 °C (59–77 °F) range, and do not react well to long, cold, winter temperatures; their immune systems are very weak below 10 °C (50 °F). Koi ponds usually have a metre or more of depth in areas of the world that become warm during the summer, whereas in areas that have harsher winters, ponds generally have a minimum of 1.5 m (5 ft). Specific pond construction has been evolved by koi keepers intent on raising show-quality koi.

The bright colors of koi put them at a severe disadvantage against predators; a white-skinned Kōhaku is highly noticeable against the dark green of a pond. Herons, kingfishers, otters, raccoons, skunk, mink, cats, foxes, and badgers are all capable of spotting out koi and eating them. A well-designed outdoor pond has areas too deep for herons to stand, overhangs high enough above the water that mammals cannot reach in, and shade trees overhead to block the view of aerial passers-by. It may prove necessary to string nets or wires above the surface. A pond usually includes a pump and a filtration system to keep the water clear.

Koi are an omnivorous fish. They eat a wide variety of foods, including peas, lettuce, and watermelon. Koi food is designed not only to be nutritionally balanced, but also to float so as to encourage them to come to the surface. When they are eating, koi can be checked for parasites and ulcers. Naturally, koi are bottom feeders with a mouth configuration adapted for that. Some koi have a tendency to eat mostly from the bottom, so food producers create a mixed sinking and floating combination food. Koi recognize the persons feeding them and gather around them at feeding times. They can be trained to take food from one's hand. In the winter, their digestive systems slow nearly to a halt, and they eat very little, perhaps no more than nibbles of algae from the bottom. Feeding is not recommended when the water temperature drops below 10 °C (50 °F). Care should be taken by hobbyists that proper oxygenation, pH stabilization, and off-gassing occur over the winter in small ponds. Their appetites do not come back until the water becomes warm in the spring.

Koi have been reported to achieve ages of 100–200 years. One famous scarlet koi named "Hanako" was owned by several individuals, the last of whom was Komei Koshihara. In July 1974, a study of the growth rings of one of the koi's scales reported that Hanako was 226 years old. Some sources give an accepted age for the species at little more than 50 years.

=== Transport and acclimatisation ===
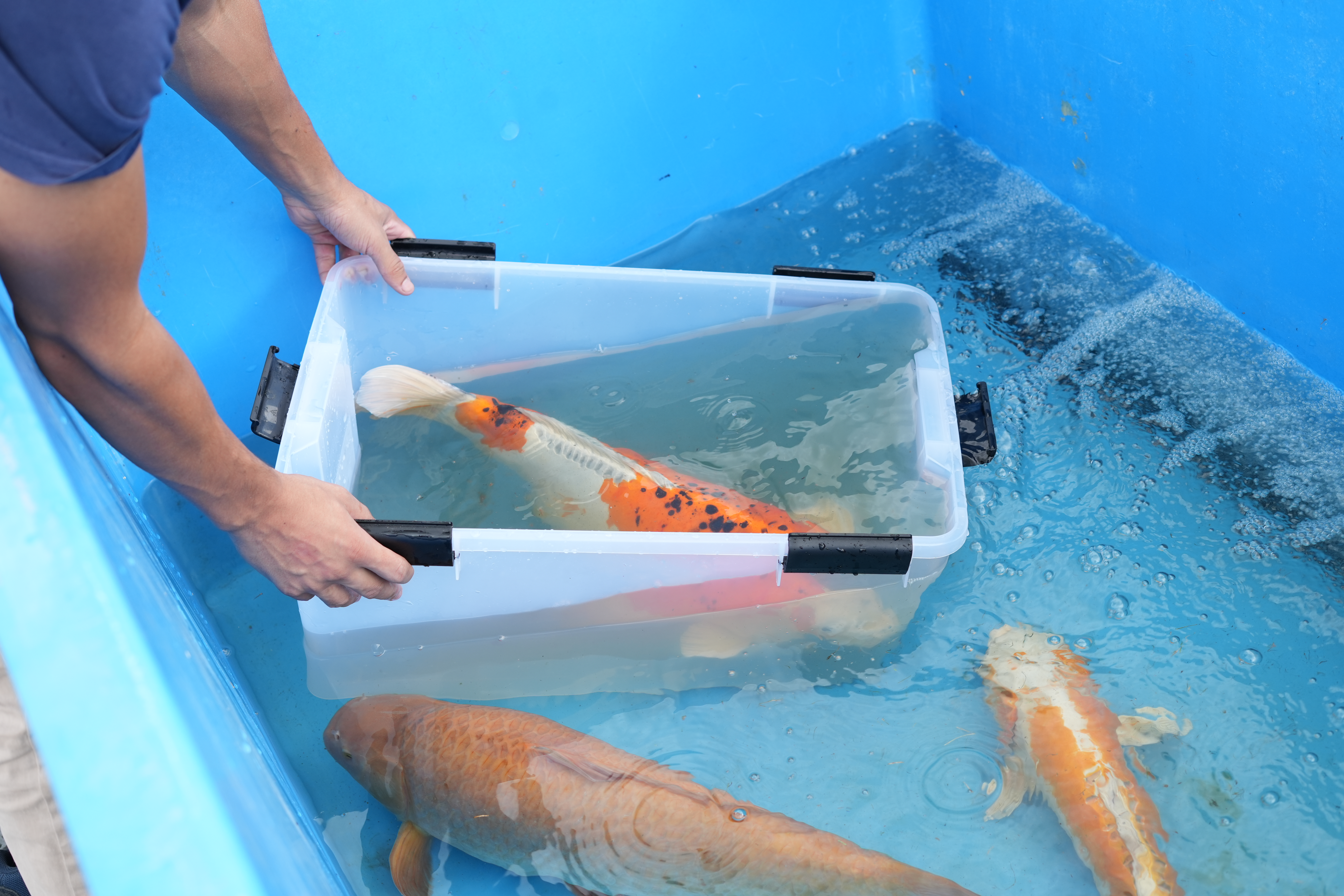
A newly arrived koi is acclimatised by floating its transport container in the holding vat until the water temperatures equalise.

Koi are moved in oxygen-filled plastic bags or sealed containers. Fish are usually fasted for a few days beforehand so that less ammonia accumulates in the transport water.

On arrival, the fish are acclimatised: the bag or container is floated in the pond or quarantine tank until the water temperatures equalise, after which pond water is added gradually to bridge differences in pH and hardness. The transport water itself is discarded rather than added to the pond. New koi are then normally quarantined for several weeks to avoid introducing diseases such as koi herpes virus.

=== Disease ===
Koi are very hardy. With proper care, they resist many of the parasites that affect more sensitive tropical fish species, such as Trichodina, Epistylis, and Ichthyophthirius multifiliis infections. Water changes help reduce the risk of diseases and keep koi from being stressed. Two of the biggest health concerns among koi breeders are the koi herpes virus (KHV) and rhabdovirus carpio, which causes spring viraemia of carp (SVC). No treatment is known for either disease. Some koi farms in Israel use the KV3 vaccine, developed by M. Kotler from the Hebrew University of Jerusalem and produced by Kovax, to immunise fish against KHV. Israel is currently the only country in the world to vaccinate koi against the KHV. The vaccine is injected into the fish when they are under one year old, and is accentuated by using an ultraviolet light. The vaccine has a 90% success rate and when immunized, the fish cannot succumb to a KHV outbreak and neither can the immunised koi pass KHV onto other fish in a pond. Only biosecurity measures such as prompt detection, isolation, and disinfection of tanks and equipment can prevent the spread of the disease and limit the loss of fish stock. In 2002, spring viraemia struck an ornamental koi farm in Kernersville, North Carolina, and required complete depopulation of the ponds and a lengthy quarantine period. For a while after this, some koi farmers in neighboring states stopped importing fish for fear of infecting their own stocks.

== Breeding ==
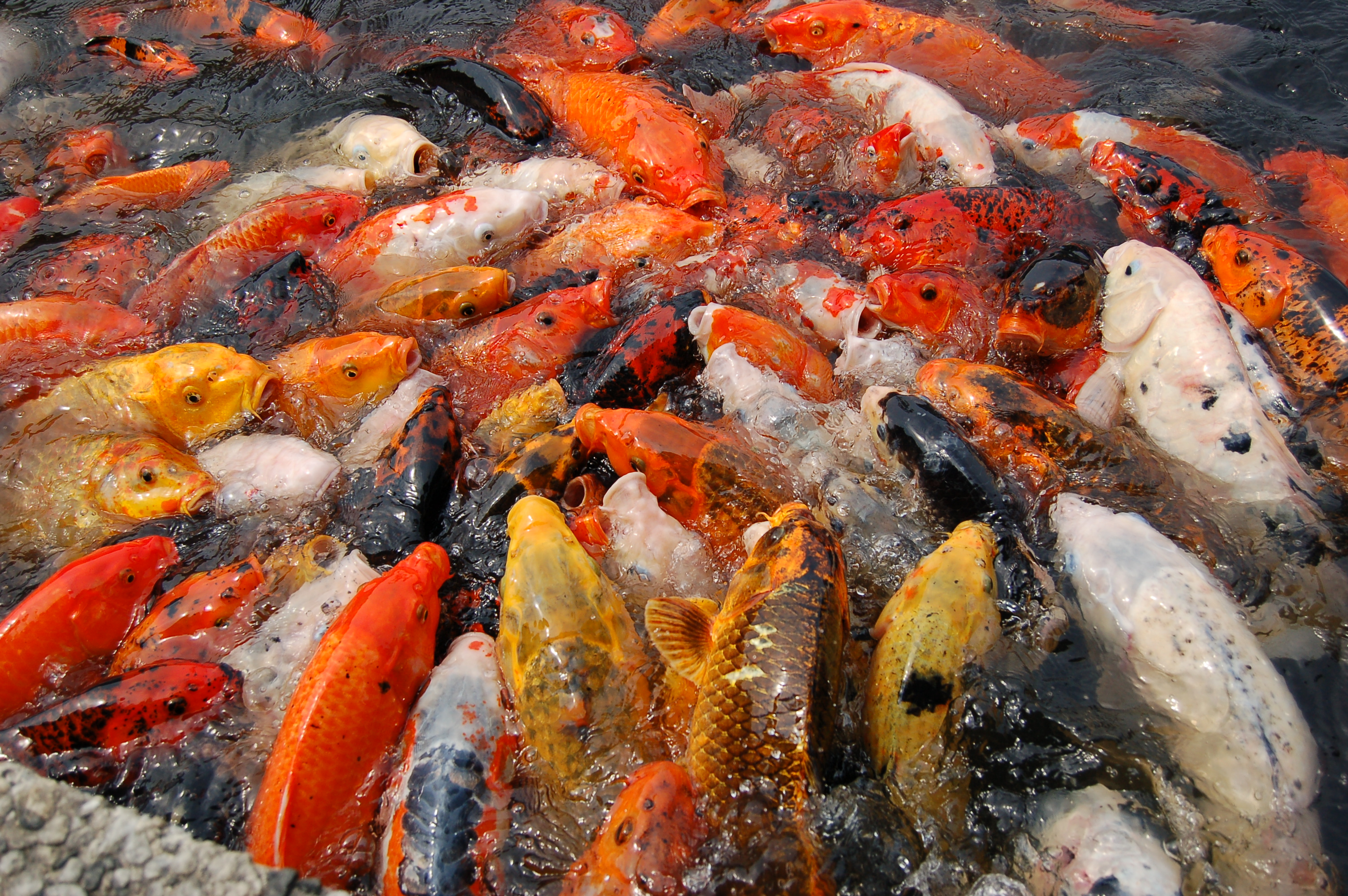
Feeding of a large school

When koi naturally breed on their own they tend to spawn in the spring and summer seasons. The male will start following the female, swimming right behind her and nudging her. After the female koi releases her eggs they sink to the bottom of the pond and stay there. A sticky outer shell around the egg helps keep it in place so it does not float around. Although the female can produce many spawns, many of the fry do not survive due to being eaten by others.

Like most fish, koi reproduce through spawning in which a female lays a vast number of eggs and one or more males fertilize them. Nurturing the resulting offspring (referred to as "fry") is a tricky and tedious job, usually done only by professionals. Although a koi breeder may carefully select the parents they wish based on their desired characteristics, the resulting fry nonetheless exhibit a wide range of color and quality.

Koi produce thousands of offspring from a single spawning. However, unlike cattle, purebred dogs, or more relevantly, goldfish, the large majority of these offspring, even from the best champion-grade koi, are not acceptable as nishikigoi (they have no interesting colors) or may even be genetically defective. These unacceptable offspring are culled at various stages of development based on the breeder's expert eye and closely guarded trade techniques. Culled fry are usually destroyed or used as feeder fish (mostly used for feeding arowana due to the belief that it will enhance its color), while older culls, within their first year between 3 and 6 inches long (also called tosai), are often sold as lower-grade, pond-quality koi.

The semi-randomized result of the koi's reproductive process has both advantages and disadvantages for the breeder. While it requires diligent oversight to narrow down the favorable result that the breeder wants, it also makes possible the development of new varieties of koi within relatively few generations.

== In the wild ==
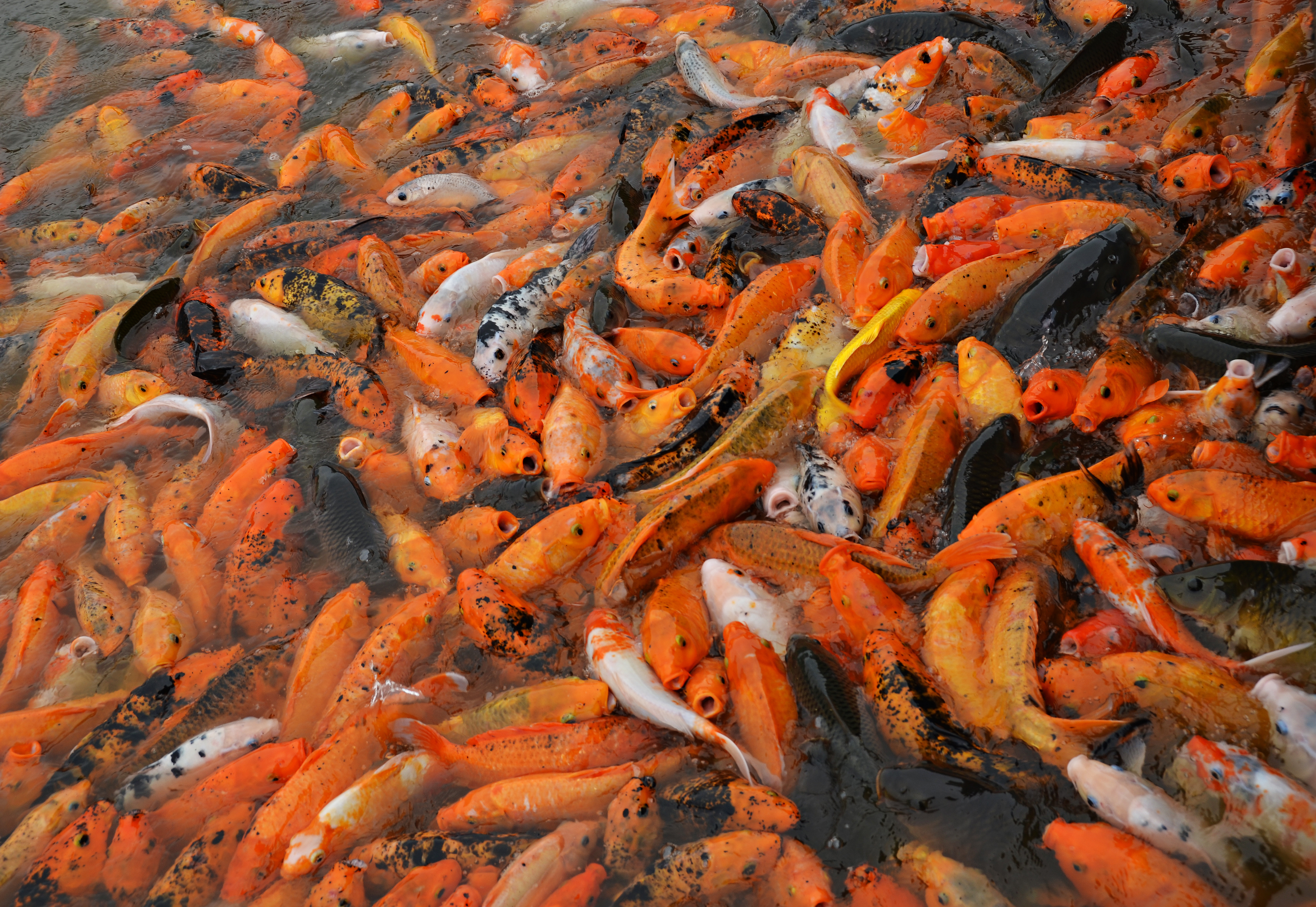
Various colors of koi feeding in a pond in Qingxiu Mountain, Nanning, China

Koi have been accidentally or deliberately released into the wild in every continent except Antarctica. They quickly revert to the natural coloration of an Amur carp within a few generations. In many areas, they are considered an invasive species and a pest. In the states of Queensland and New South Wales in Australia, they are considered noxious fish.

In Japan, koi releases are sometimes held as an event for tourism purposes. However, as koi is artificial breed, this causes genetic pollution by breeding with native carps.

Koi greatly increase the turbidity of the water because they are constantly stirring up the substrate. This makes waterways unattractive, reduces the abundance of aquatic plants, and can render the water unsuitable for swimming or drinking, even by livestock. In some countries, koi have caused so much damage to waterways that vast amounts of money and effort have been spent trying to eradicate them, largely unsuccessfully.

In many areas of North America, koi are introduced into the artificial "water hazards" and ponds on golf courses to keep water-borne insect larvae under control through predation.

== In common culture ==
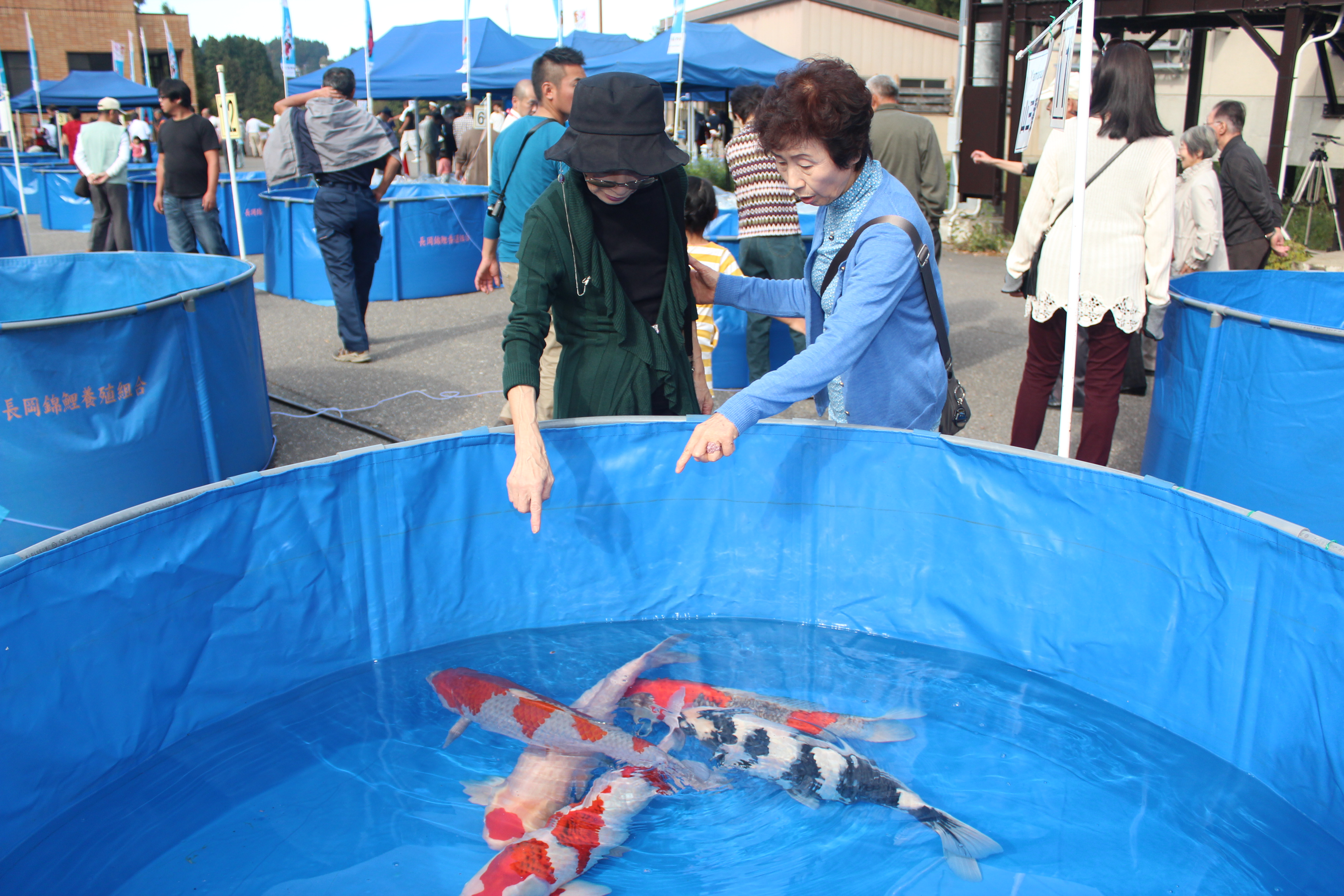
61st Nagaoka Koi Show at Yamakoshi Branch Office, Nagaoka, Niigata Prefecture, Japan

In Japan, the koi is a symbol of luck, prosperity, and good fortune, and also of perseverance in the face of adversity. Ornamental koi are symbolic of Japanese culture and are closely associated with the country's national identity. The custom of koinobori (carp streamers), which began in the Edo period (1603–1867), is still practiced today and displayed in gardens on Children's Day, 5 May. It is particularly popular in China, while in Japan it traditionally competes with the Japanese rice fish for the title of the country’s most popular ornamental fish.

In Chinese culture, the koi represents fame, family harmony, and wealth. It is a feng shui favorite, symbolizing abundance as well as perseverance and strength, and has a mythical potential to transform into a dragon. Since the late 20th century, the keeping of koi in outdoor water gardens has become popular among the more affluent Chinese. Koi ponds are found in Chinese communities around the world, and the number of people who keep koi imported from Niigata, has been increasing. In addition, there are increasing numbers of Japanese koi bred in China that are sold domestically and exported to foreign countries.

Koi are also popular in many countries in the equatorial region, where outdoor water gardens are popular. In Sri Lanka, interior courtyards most often have one or several fish ponds dedicated to koi.

== See also ==
- Culture of Japan
- Japanese aesthetics
- Japanese white crucian carp
