= Black gill disease =

Bacterial disease of fish

Black gill disease, also known as black spot disease or black death, is a disease affecting various species of marine animals, including shellfish and crustaceans, across the Atlantic and Pacific oceans. The disease is characterized by the visibly noticeable black melanated gills, speculated to be caused by a fungus called Fusarium solani or a similarly shaped ciliate. Human consumption of fish affected by black gill disease is harmless.

A significant portion of the aquaculture communities and fishing businesses have scientifically observed a steady decline in healthy fish capture since 1996, contributing to a shortage of shrimp and fish in the food industry. The origin of the fungus agent causing black gill disease is unknown and unlikely to dissipate. Researchers have also observed a causal relationship between the disease and environmental factors, such as waste spill contamination, ocean pollution, and climate change.

Studies to determine the prevalence of the disease have been largely conducted by methodically collecting batches of healthy and infected shrimp across regional coastlines. Two main species of shrimp used for research include Litopenaeus setiferus (white shrimp) and Farfantepenaeus aztecus (brown shrimp).

== Characteristics ==
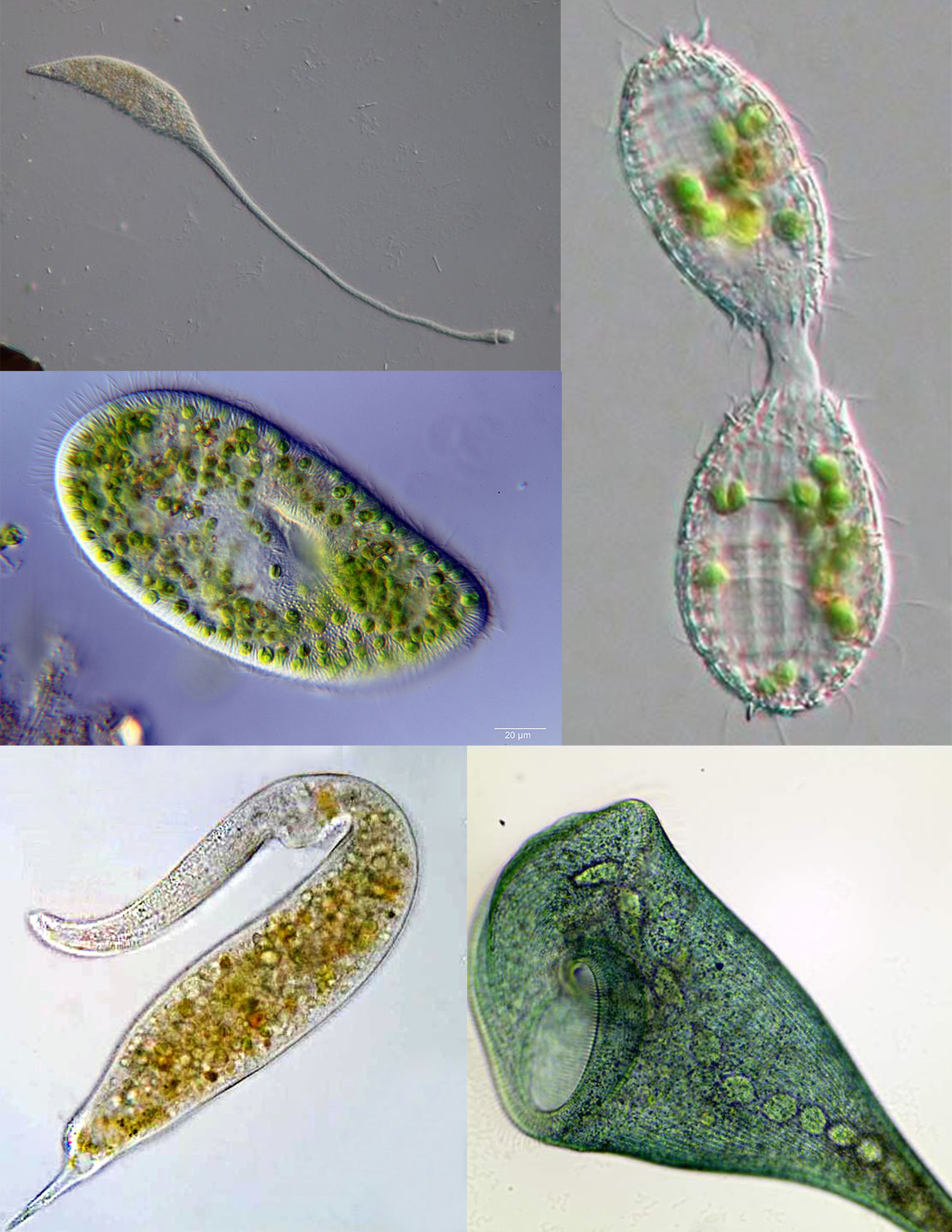
A circular fungus attaches itself to gill nodules in shrimp.

Black gill disease is visible to the human eye. Affected gills may exhibit crusted, surface-corroding, scattered light brown to black spots or a large black patch on one or both sides of the fish. Discoloration at the gill area will be distinct from the rest of the body. These symptoms are separate from gill fouling or fin rot.

Normal colored shrimp do not necessarily mean a lack of infection. Scientists have microscopically observed the ciliate in shrimp that had not reached the discoloration phase. Seen under an electron microscope, the foreign circular ciliates (30–38 μm) attach to the gill nodules, creating cystic imprints on the tissue. More rarely, the ciliate may penetrate the tissue and house invasively.

The fungus is potentially contagious. Upon capture, an infected head placed near an entirely healthy animal can infect the latter.

== Causes ==
Many potential pathogens can cause black gill, including bacteria, viruses, fungi, and ciliates. Abiotic stress, such as injury and foreign bodies, can also activate a crustacean's immune system and result in melanin production and black gill symptoms.

Research in the Persian Gulf, China, and India has resulted in an initial determination that a fungus exactly or related to Fusarium solani is responsible for black gill disease.

The ciliate attacks fish respiration processes.

Extensive research ongoing since 2010 and funded by the University of Georgia has determined that an invasive ciliate strain, possibly Hyalophysa chattoni, attaches itself to gill nodules. The presumed ciliate propagates while activating oxygenation of phenols within the organic makeup of the sea creature. This oxygenation process results in melanin, leading to the visible black tissue. But most importantly, the ciliate impairs and blocks necessary respiratory processes and hemolymph flows for ion regulation. The diseased gills inhibit the entire immune system, leading to early natural death or inability to evade other ocean predators.

Metal contamination originating from industrial waste, oil spills, and general water pollution has been reported as a contributing factor to the black gill disease epidemic seen in crustaceans. A direct correlation has not been confirmed.

Environmental and climate changes affecting temperature and salt water content have been confirmed sources of parasite families, including ciliates. In a controlled environment, it is possible to prevent cases of black gill disease. The water should have 10-20 parts per thousand parts salinity and filtered. Scientists have reviewed ocean lifeforms in reference to possible effects of Pacifical Decadal Oscillation and El Niño climate occurrences, concluding the patterned emergence of black gill disease is linked to large-scale weather events.

== Affected regions ==
Black gill disease is confirmed in fish, crabs, and shrimp at human populated coastlines across four continents. Each region's scientists conducted histological study of shrimp control and diseased groups. The results present the universality of black gill disease across all water bodies.

=== Asia ===
- China: In 2020, seeking prevention methods against high shrimp death rates, Chinese shrimp farms conducted genetic testing of infected specimens, finalizing Fusarium solani as the cause. The experimental results concluded an 88.66% mortality rate amongst its diseased shrimp.
- Japan
- Philippines
- India: Researchers gathered over 500 yeast examples from India's southwestern coastline, concluding at least one fungus as fatal for shrimps.

=== North America ===
- Chesapeake Bay Area
- North Carolina
- South Carolina
- Georgia: The Georgia Department of Natural Resources has operated shrimp collection for academic purposes since 1976, affirming the presence of black gill disease since the early 2000s.
- Gulf of Mexico

=== Australia ===
- Black gilled crabs were detected by researchers, who cited a ciliate from the Apostomatida family as the cause.

== Other impacts ==
The seafood industry based out of the Carolinas and Georgia experienced a decline in shrimp capture beginning from 1996, generating half the revenue by 2014 at $5.5 million.

University of Georgia's research for the cause of black gill disease in the U.S. Southeast coast led to the first-time sequencing of rRNA (18S rRNA) gene (1634 bp) from the suspected Hyalophysa chattoni ciliate related strain. The sequence has been recorded in the National Center for Biotechnology Information Genbank database.
