= Marguerite Lwoff =

French microbiologist and virologist (1905–1979)

- Born: Marguerite Bourdaleix; 7 July 1905; France
- Died: 31 October 1979 (aged 74)
- Education: University of Paris
- Occupations: microbiologist and virologist
- Spouse: André Lwoff

Marguerite Lwoff (née Bourdaleix; 7 July 1905 – 31 October 1979) was a French microbiologist and virologist known for her studies of metabolism. She worked alongside her husband, André Lwoff, throughout their careers, but she was not awarded the Nobel Prize when he received it in 1965.

== Life and work ==
Marguerite Bourdaleix was born in France and earned her Ph.D. at the University of Paris. She became known for her work in biology and her specialization in Protozoon physciology and research focus on growth factors and cytology. On 5 December 1925, she married scientist André Lwoff.

In 1929, she and her husband were awarded a laboratory at the Pasteur Institute in Paris. According to the Pasteur Institute, her career began with studies of ciliates and continued with major research on the Apostomatida, working with Edouard Chatton and Andre Lwoff, her husband at the Roscoff Marine Biological Station:

[She] entered the Institut Pasteur as grant holder in the service of protozoology headed by F. Mesnil. In collaboration with A. Lwoff and Ed. Chatton, she worked on morphology, organisation, life cycle and taxonomy of free and parasitic unicellular ciliate protozoa. Her own research focused on the feeding of some particular flagellate trypanosomids. She thus showed that hematin, a chemical substance, could substitute to blood for nutrition of Crithidia fasciculata. This observation has played an important role in the development of A. and M. Lwoff works on nature and role of growth factors. With A. Wolff, she determined the quantitative need of a microorganism for a given growth factor, the chemical specificity of the required substance, the complementary concepts of essential metabolite and loss of synthesis power.

In the process of studying Haemophilus metabolism, she and her husband discovered the role of a coenzyme, cozymase.

Lwoff published her solo research in 1940 on trypanosome metabolism, describing the role of hematin. Four years later, she was appointed Head of Laboratory at the Pasteur Institute.

Though the husband and wife Lwoff researchers continued their working partnership and published their results both separately and together, Andre began to receive more and more credit and Marguerite came to be discounted as simply a technician. Her husband received the Nobel Prize in Medicine in 1965.

=== Timeline ===
Lwoff's work took her to many assignments and laboratories.

- 1933, Heidelberg, Germany, went with A. Lwoff to the Kaiser Wilhelm Institut (now the Max Planck Institut) to work with Otto Meyerhof.
- 1936, Cambridge, United Kingdom, with A. Lwoff to the laboratory of David Keilin.
- 1939–1953 Paris, Named Secretary of the editorial board of the Bulletin de l'Institut Pasteur.
- 1940, Defended her PhD thesis in sciences: Recherches sur le pouvoir de synthèse des flagellés trypanosomides. M. Caullery was the president of her thesis jury.
- 1944, Named Head of Laboratory at the Pasteur Institute. There she pursued her research, such as with P. Nicolle, on the feeding of Hematophogous reduviidae.
- 1954–1955, Pasadena, California, US with A. Lwoff, to work at several laboratories, such as those of Renato Dulbecco in Pasadena.
- 1955–1970, Paris, Pasteur Institute, André and Marguerite Lwoff changed their research focus to study animal viruses. Marguerite became responsible for cell cultures in which she highlighted the effect of temperature on the different steps of the development cycle of the Polio virus. She "performed isolation of hot and cold mutants, and expressed reflections about the role of fever in viral infection and about the nature of attenuated viral strains."
- 1970, Marguerite Lwoff retired.

== Selected publications ==
- Lwoff, M. (1929). Cultivation Medium for T. cruzi. Bulletin de la Société de Pathologie Exotique, 22(10).
- Lwoff, Andreas; Lwoff, Marguerite (1937). "Studies on codehydrogenases I —Nature of growth factor "V"". Proceedings of the Royal Society of London B Biological Sciences. 122 (828): 352–359. doi:10.1098/rspb.1937.0029. Wikidata Q123702228.
- Lwoff, Andreas; Lwoff, Marguerite (1937). "Studies on codehydrogenases II—Physiological function of growth factor "V"". Proceedings of the Royal Society of London B Biological Sciences. 122 (828): 360–373. doi:10.1098/rspb.1937.0030. Wikidata Q123702231.
- Lwoff, M., & Nicolle, P. (1944). Recherches sur la nutrition des réduvidés hémophages. IV. Alimentation de Triatoma infestans Klug à l'aide-de sérum de cheval. Action du glucose. Bulletin de la Société de Pathologie Exotique, 37(1-2).
- Lwoff, M. (1951). The nutrition of parasitic flagellates (Trypanosomidae, Trichomonadinae). In Biochemistry and physiology of protozoa (pp. 129–176). Academic Press.
- Lwoff, M. (1951). Nutrition of parasitic amebae. In Biochemistry and Physiology of Protozoa (pp. 235–250). Academic Press.
- André Lwoff; Marguerite Lwoff (1962). "Événements Cycliques et Molécules Métastables". Journal of Theoretical Biology (in French). 2 (1): 48–62. doi:10.1016/s0022-5193(62)80026-5. Wikidata Q123702225.
- Grossberg SE; Lwoff M; Lwoff A (1966). "Exaltation of the development of poliovirus by semicarbazide". Journal of Bacteriology. 92 (5): 1473–1477. doi:10.1128/jb.92.5.1473-1477.1966. PMC 276448. PMID 4288608. Wikidata Q37393590.
