= Hyalophysa clampi =

Scientific classification
- Domain: Eukaryota
- Clade: Diaphoretickes
- Clade: SAR
- Clade: Alveolata
- Phylum: Ciliophora
- Class: Oligohymenophorea
- Order: Apostomatida
- Family: Foettingeriidae
- Genus: Hyalophysa
- Species: H. clampi

Binomial name
- Hyalophysa clampi Browning & Landers, 2012

Species of single-celled organism

Hyalophysa clampi is a species of freshwater alveolates known as an apostome ciliate. It was found on crayfish and described by Jeremy S. Browning and Stephen C. Landers in 2012.
