= Clifford Dobell =

English biologist

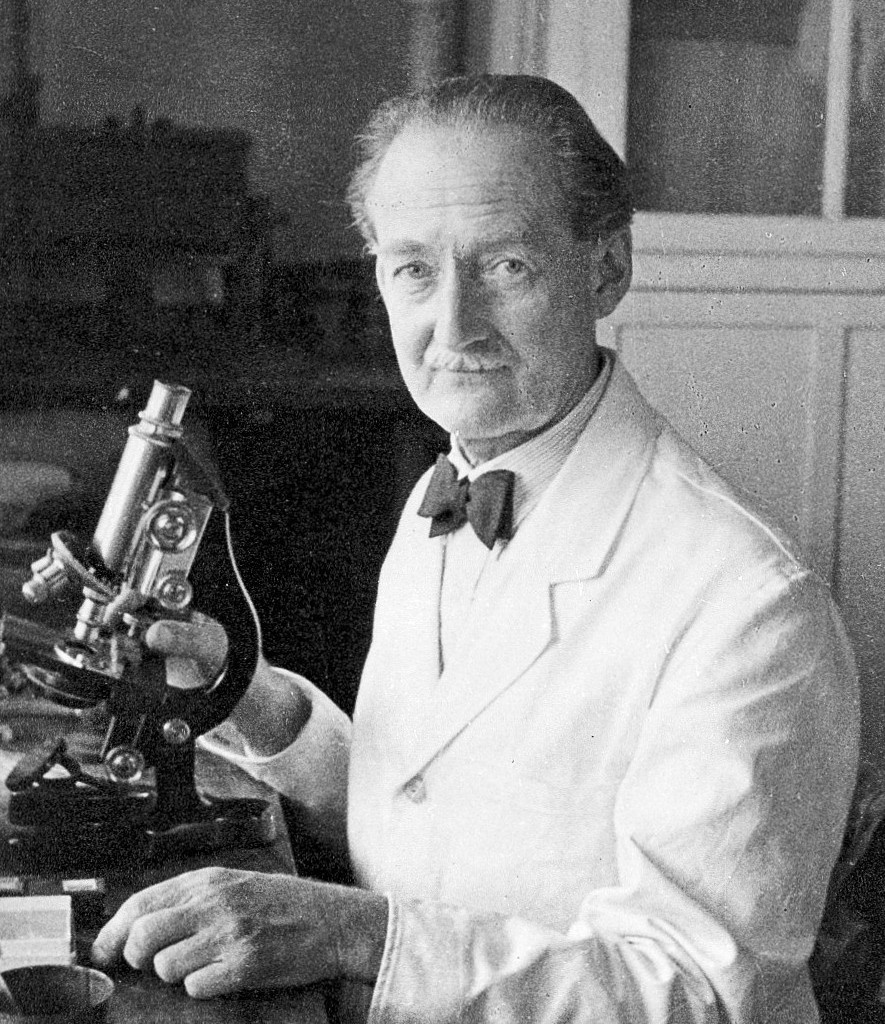
Clifford Dobell in 1949

Cecil Clifford Dobell FRS (22 February 1886, Birkenhead – 23 December 1949, London) was a biologist, specifically a protozoologist. He studied intestinal amoebae, and algae. He was a leading authority on the history of protistology.

== Life ==
Clifford Dobell was educated at Sandringham School, Southport, and Trinity College, Cambridge, where he graduated with a first-class degree in natural sciences in 1906 under the tutelage of Adam Sedgwick.

From 1910 to 1919, Dobell was assistant professor of protistology and cytology at Imperial College London. During the First World War he helped military medical staff improve prevention and treatment of ailments associated with intestinal protozoa. At this time he was, as P. O. Crossfield in the British Medical Journal later explained, "one of the first to demonstrate the existence and to appreciate the epidemiological significance of symptomless carriers of Entamoeba histolytica, whose number among the inhabitants of Great Britain he estimated at 10%."

In 1918, at the age of 32, Dobell was elected a Fellow of the Royal Society. His candidature citation described him as: "Fellow of Trinity College, Cambridge; Lecturer on Zoology at the Imperial College of Science and Technology. Walsingham Medallist, 1908. Rolleston Prizeman, 1908. Balfour Student, 1908–1909. Distinguished for the wide range of his researches on the Protista and for the skill he has shown in the investigations of their structure and life-histories (e.g., 'Copromonas subtilis', 'Chromidina', 'Entamoeba ranarum'). His researches have also thrown light upon the nucleus of the Bacteria, on the alleged sexual phenomena of the same group, and on the nature of the Spirochaets and Cyanophyceae. Author of numerous scientific memoirs, of which the following may be mentioned: – Observations on the Life-history of 'Adelea ovata', A Schn (Proc Roy Soc, 1907); The Structure and Life-history of 'Copromonas subtilis' n g n sp (ibid, 1908); Researches on the Intestinal Protozoa of Frogs and Toads (ibid); Chromidia and the Binuclearity Hypotheses; a Review and a Criticism (ibid); Contributions to the Life-History of 'Hoemocystidium simondi', Cast and Will (Festschr fur R Hertwig, 1910); Contributions to the Cytology of the Bacteria (Quart Journ Micros Sci, 1911); Paraspirillum Vejdovskii' n g n sp, a new Bacterial Form (ibid); On the Systematic Position of the Spirochaets (Proc Roy Soc, 1912); Researches on the Spirochaets and Related Organisms (Archiv für Protistenkunde, 1911).

In 1919 he published a monograph, The Amoebae Living in Man. In 1932 he published the authoritative work on Antonie van Leeuwenhoek: Antony van Leeuwenhoek and his "Little Animals", which was reprinted in 1960 (ISBN 0-486-60594-9).
