= Pseudocollinia beringensis =

Scientific classification
- Domain: Eukaryota
- Supergroup: Alveolata
- Phylum: Ciliophora
- Class: Oligohymenophorea
- Order: Apostomatida
- Family: Pseudocolliniidae
- Genus: Pseudocollinia
- Species: P. beringensis

Binomial name
- Pseudocollinia beringensis (Capriulo & Small, 1986)

Synonyms
- Collinia beringensis Capriulo & Small, 1986

Species of single-celled organism

Pseudocollinia beringensis is a species of parasitoid ciliate of the family Pseudocolliniidae. It is an endoparasite of Thysanoessa inermis, a species of krill.
