= A.C. Redfield Lifetime Achievement Award =

The Lifetime Achievement Award was first presented in 1994 to honor major long-term achievements in the fields of limnology and oceanography, including research, education and service to the community and society. In 2004, the Association for the Sciences of Limnology and Oceanography board renamed the award in honor of Alfred C. Redfield.

== Recipients ==
Year^{[A]}	Recipient	Rationale
1994	Kenneth H. Mann	"In recognition of his significant achievements in the aquatic sciences, his contributions to the stature of these fields, and his role as a model for those at earlier career stages"
1995	Clifford H. Mortimer	"In recognition of his lasting and substantive contributions across disciplines of aquatic biology, chemistry and physics, his leadership, and his general commitment to excellence"
1996	Ruth Patrick	"For her outstanding contributions to aquatic ecology and environmental problem solving, her pioneering work on algae as indicators of water quality, and her leadership as an educator within and outside of academia"
1997	Alan R. Longhurst	"In recognition of sustained excellence in the study of marine food webs and biogeography, and of outstanding leadership in the development of international collaboration and in the administration of world-renowned oceanographic programs"
1998	Karl Banse	"For his prolific, diverse, and seminal papers on key oceanographic issues, rigorous application of the scientific method, high intellectual standards, and excellence in teaching"
1999	Charles S. Yentsch	"For sustained and innovative contributions in the fields of phytoplankton pigments and productivity, optical properties and remote sensing, and for establishing and sustaining oceanographic initiatives and programs"
2000	Ramon Margalef	"For his research and teaching on the subjects of plankton succession and the role of physical processes in structuring plankton communities that have guided the oceanography field for four decades"
2001	Jack Vallentyne	"For his exemplary research contributions in paleolimnology, biogeochemistry and eutrophication; outstanding administrative accomplishments in forming and fostering the Experimental Lakes Area; and passionate efforts in educating children in environmental, ecological and limnological issues"
2002	John J. Magnuson	"For his extensive and effective service to the limnological and oceanographic communities, including leadership in national and international programs that have strengthened both science and policy, and for his seminal approaches to the community ecology of lakes and lake districts"
2003	John J. Gilbert	"For developing and sustaining the field of rotifer ecology and biology; for successful mentorship for more than a quarter century; and for vital service contributions to the national and international communities of limnologists and oceanographers"
2004	Charles R. Goldman	"For his enduring efforts to understand and protect Lake Tahoe, his inspiring mentorship of numerous students who themselves have made lasting scientific contributions, and for his tireless advocacy for limnological research, training and stewardship worldwide"
2005	Andre Morel	"For leading our modern understanding of ocean color, particularly in Case 1 waters, where the optical properties are dominated by biology; and for fundamental work in the interpretation of satellite observations of ocean color"
2006	Tom Fenchel	"For opening our eyes to the fascinating world of low Reynolds numbers and rapid diffusion and to the amazing adaptations of chemotactic and locomotive behaviour developed by protozoa and bacteria to life in a heterogenerous world"
2007	Jörg Imberger	"For major contributions in physical limnology and particularly for fundamental insights into lake stratification and mixing dynamics through observational, theoretical and modeling studies"
2008	John Hobbie	"For contributions in the field of aquatic microbial ecology and involvement with the development of important institutions and research programs"
2009	Peter J. LeB. Williams	"For his outstanding contributions to our understanding of oceanic productivity, carbon cycling and metabolic balance and for his role in shaping current views on the importance of microbial processes in the oceans"
2010	James F. Kitchell	"For field-changing contributions in the areas of fish ecology and fisheries, trophic dynamics, and understanding the role of fish in aquatic ecosystems."
2011	Frederick Grassle	"For fundamental discoveries in deep sea ecology, visionary leadership of marine sciences, selfless community service, and groundbreaking technical innovations that will shape oceanography for decades to come."
2012	Winfried Lampert and Maciej Gliwicz	"For their outstanding individual and collaborative research, which has laid the foundations for our current understanding of phytoplankton-zooplankton interactions, trophic ecology of zooplankton, and evolutionary relationships in freshwater ecosystems."
2013	Bruce J. Peterson	"For innovative and transformative studies of carbon, nutrient and water cycles at process, ecosystem and global scales."
2014	Gene E. Likens	"For his extraordinary long-term contributions to the fields of limnology and oceanography–including research, education, and service within and beyond the aquatic sciences community."
2015	David Schindler	"For his unfaltering record of revolutionary limnological research that addressed the most important aquatic environmental issues of our time."
2016	Evelyn Sherr and Barry Sherr	"For their lifetime research on food-web interactions, protists, and the factors controlling the activity, growth, and survival of aquatic microorganisms."
2017	Bo Barker Jørgensen	"For fundamental contributions to unraveling the ecology and biogeochemical interactions of microbes in environments ranging from surface sediments to the deep biosphere."
2018	Lisa Levin	"For her extraordinary long-term contributions to understanding the composition and function of seafloor ecosystems, and for her leadership in identifying and communicating anthropogenic pressures on aquatic ecosystems, with relevance to policies for sustainable and healthy seas."
2019	Stephen Carpenter	"In recognition of his remarkable contributions to the field of limnology and lake management; including major advances in our understanding of trophic cascades, eutrophication, regime shifts, fisheries sustainability, and social ecological systems via approaches that confront theory with large-scale collaborative experimentation, long-term lake surveys, community outreach, and education."
2020	Sybil Seitzinger	"In recognition of her critical research on the nutrient biogeochemistry of coastal and freshwater ecosystems spanning from molecular organic chemical characterization to global scale models and the application of new knowledge."
2021	Ronald Benner	"For transformative and enduring revelations regarding the origins, composition, and reactivity of organic matter in Earth's ecosystems – from inland waters to the deep sea."
2022	Edward Carpenter	"For his critical contributions that clarified the important role of open ocean nitrogen fixation in driving the ecology of the ocean and global biogeochemistry"

Notes

The information in the table is according to the "A.C. Redfield Lifetime Achievement Award" webpage of the Association for the Sciences of Limnology and Oceanography unless otherwise specified by additional citations.
