= Hyalophysa =

Scientific classification
- Domain: Eukaryota
- Clade: Sar
- Clade: Alveolata
- Phylum: Ciliophora
- Class: Oligohymenophorea
- Order: Apostomatida
- Family: Foettingeriidae
- Genus: Hyalophysa; Bradbury 1966

Species
- Hyalophysa clampi; Hyalophysa chattoni Bradbury 1966

Genus of single-celled organisms

Hyalophysa is a genus of apostome ciliates of the family Foettingeriidae.
