= Pseudocollinia brintoni =

Scientific classification
- Domain: Eukaryota
- Supergroup: Alveolata
- Phylum: Ciliophora
- Class: Oligohymenophorea
- Order: Apostomatida
- Family: Pseudocolliniidae
- Genus: Pseudocollinia
- Species: P. brintoni

Binomial name
- Pseudocollinia brintoni Gómez-Gutiérrez, Strüder-Kypke, Lynn, Shaw, Aguilar-Méndez, López-Cortés, Martínez-Gómez & Robinson, 2012

Species of single-celled organism

Pseudocollinia brintoni is a species of parasitoid ciliate of the family Pseudocolliniidae. P. brintoni infects a species of krill, Nyctiphanes simplex.
