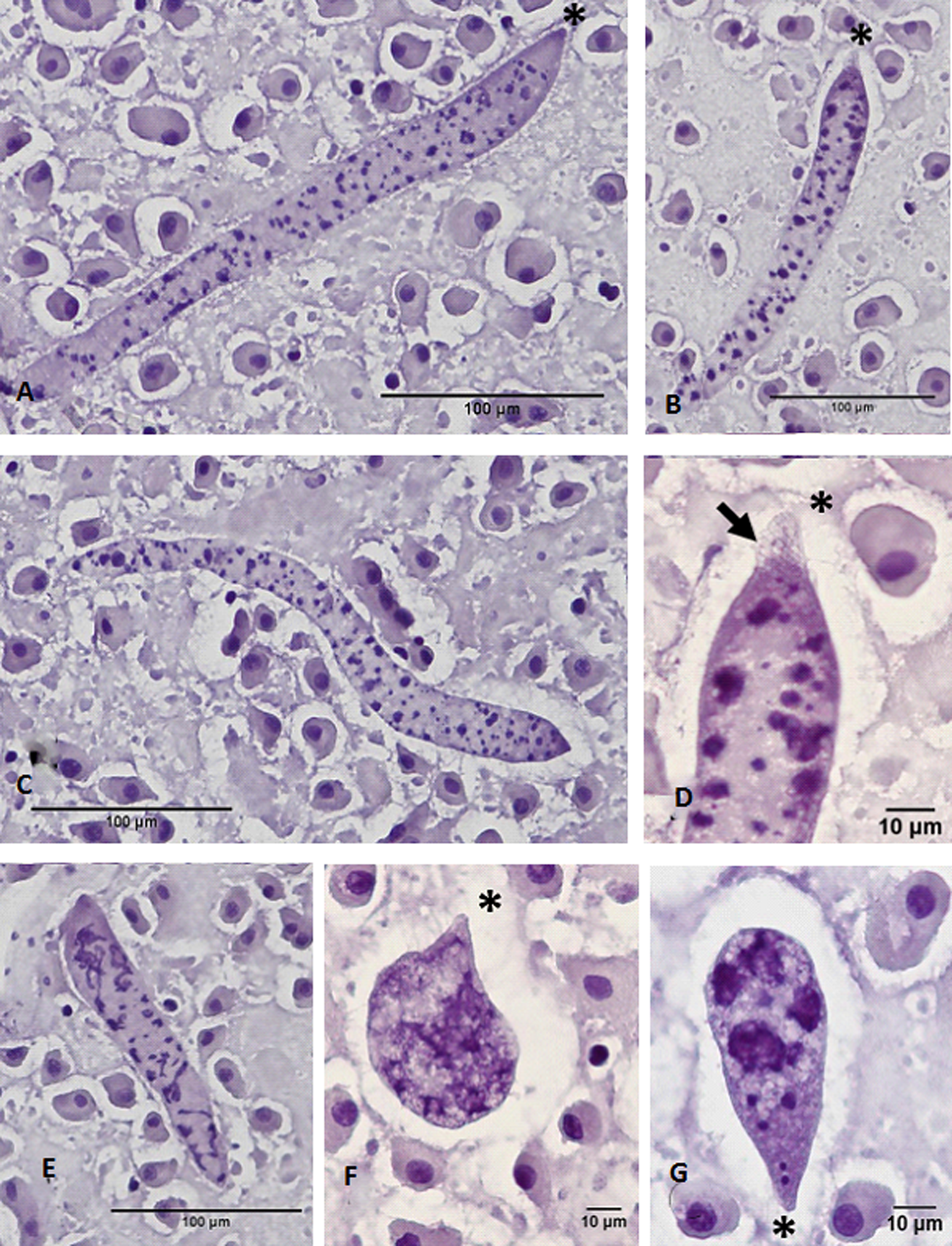
- Chromidina sp.

Scientific classification
- Domain: Eukaryota
- Clade: Sar
- Clade: Alveolata
- Phylum: Ciliophora
- Class: Oligohymenophorea
- Order: Astomatophorida
- Family: Opalinopsidae
- Genus: Chromidina; Gonder, 1905

Species
- Chromidina chattoni Souidenne et al., 2016; Chromidina coronata (Foettinger, 1881); Chromidina cortezi (Hochberg, 1971); Chromidina elegans (Foettinger, 1881)

= Chromidina =

Genus of single-celled organisms

Chromidina is a genus of apostome ciliates of the family Opalinopsidae. Species of Chromidina are parasitic in the renal and pancreatic appendages of cephalopods.

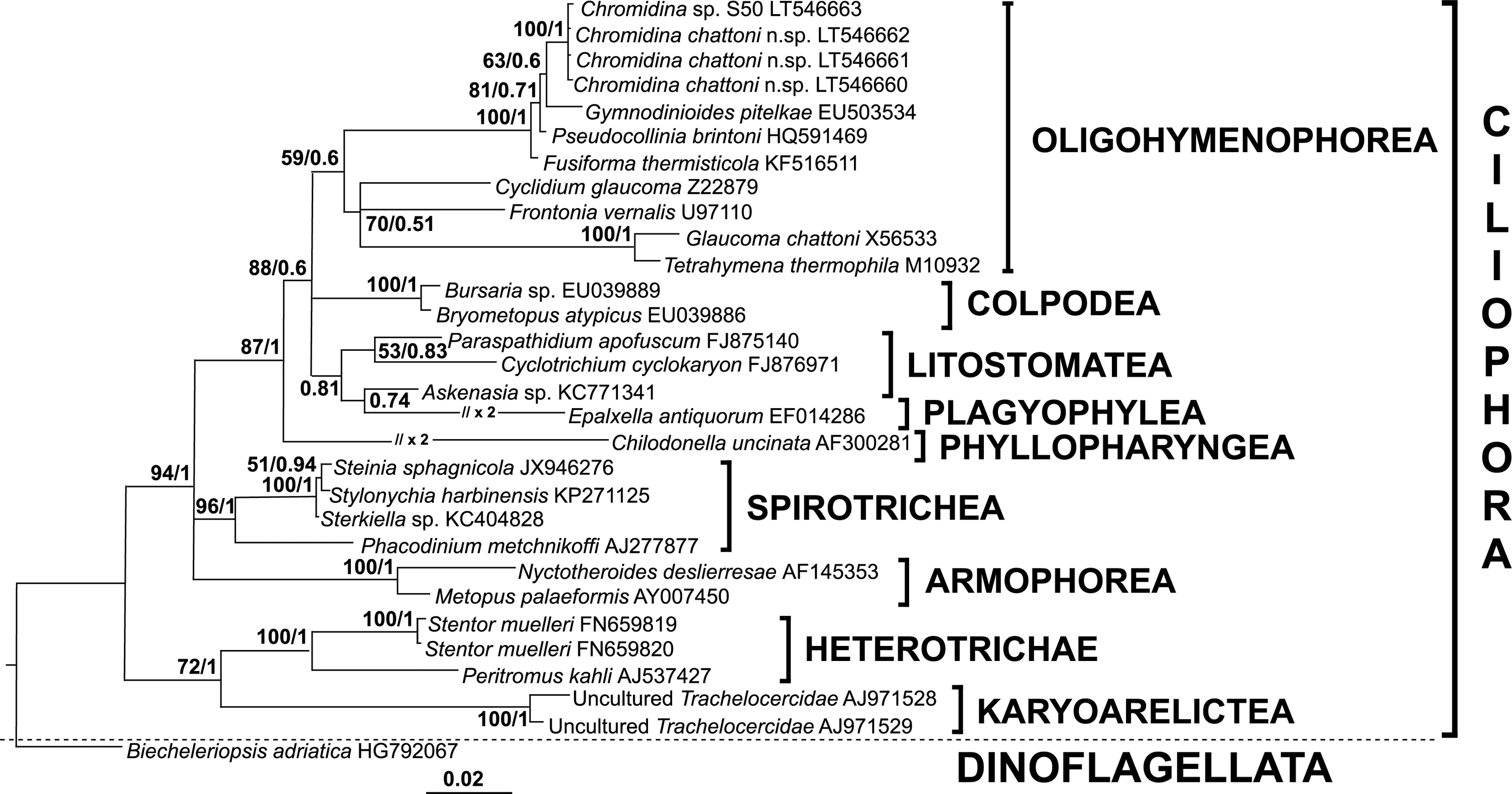
Phylogenetic position of Chromidina spp. within Ciliophora

In 2016, a molecular study found that the closest relatives of Chromidina spp. were species of the apostome Pseudocollinia.
