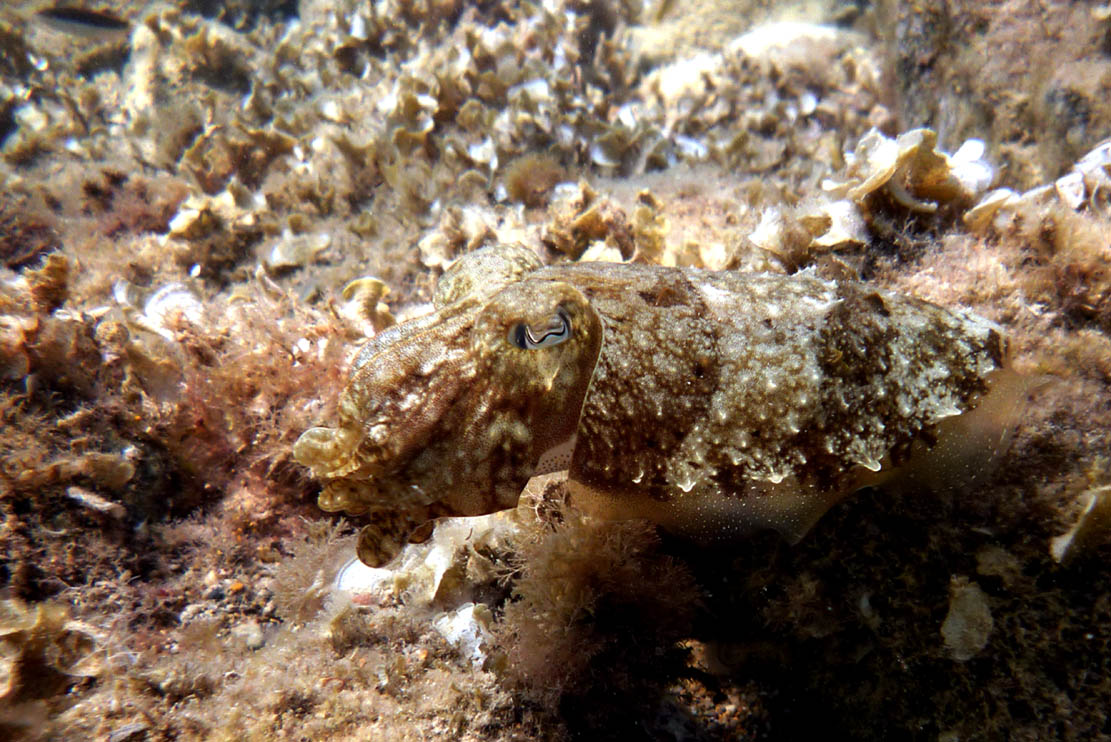

Conservation status
- Data Deficient (IUCN 3.1)

Scientific classification
- Kingdom: Animalia
- Phylum: Mollusca
- Class: Cephalopoda
- Order: Sepiida
- Family: Sepiidae
- Genus: Rhombosepion
- Species: R. elegans

Binomial name
- Rhombosepion elegans Blainville, 1827

Synonyms
- Sepia biserialis Blainville, 1827; Sepia bisserialis Vérany, 1851; Sepia italica Risso, 1854; Sepia rubens Philippi, 1844; Sepia rupellaria de Férussac & d'Orbigny, 1835

= Rhombosepion elegans =

Species of cuttlefish

Rhombosepion elegans, the elegant cuttlefish, is a species of cuttlefish in the family Sepiidae from the eastern Atlantic Ocean and the Mediterranean Sea. It is an important species for fisheries in some parts of the Mediterranean where its population may have suffered from overfishing.

== Description ==
Rhombosepion elegans is a small species of cuttlefish which has an elongated mantle which is oval in shape and has a length that is more than two times greater than its width, with a maximum mantle length of 80mm. It has a short, broad tentacular club which is blunt towards its tip and has 6-8 suckers in oblique, crosswise rows. with three very enlarged suckers in the central part of the club. It has short arms and these are less than half the total length of the head and arms, each arm has two rows of suckers. The edge of the dorsal margin of the mantle protrudes at its anterior end in a lobe between the animal's eyes. The fins have their origin a short distance from the anterior edge of the mantle gut do not extend beyond mantle's anterior margin and they do not get wider towards the rear. The underside of the mantle has a longitudinal row of 6 narrow ridges along each side near the fins; the middle 2 pairs being larger than the posterior 2 pairs and the posterior 2 pairs.

It is coloured red through to brown on its back, however, other describers give the overall colour as reddish brown. The head has a small number of scattered chromatophores, the arms are unmarked and the pale dorsal mantle is mottled with purple-black chromatophores. The fins and the underside of the mantle are paler with the ventral mantle ridges being whitish.

The arrangement of the suckers on the arms are sexually dimorphic, in the males, arm I has two series of suckers for a few rows with the remainder being arranged in four series as are all the suckers on arms II and III on each side except for those at the arm tips which are in two series. The suckers on arms IV vary in their arrangement with 2 to 4 rows if suckers in two series. In the females most of the arms have two series of suckers near the head and four series towards the tip, there are 5 rows of suckers in two series on arms I to III, 2 to 4 rows on arms IV. The suckers of the males are larger in the middle of the arm than those at the sides. The hectocotylus is situated on the left ventral arm and has 1 or 2 rows of normal size suckers near the head, 9 to 11 rows of highly reduced very small suckers in the middle part of the arm and then it has normal sized suckers towards the tip of the arms. These suckers are in 2 dorsal and 2 ventral series which are laterally displaced.

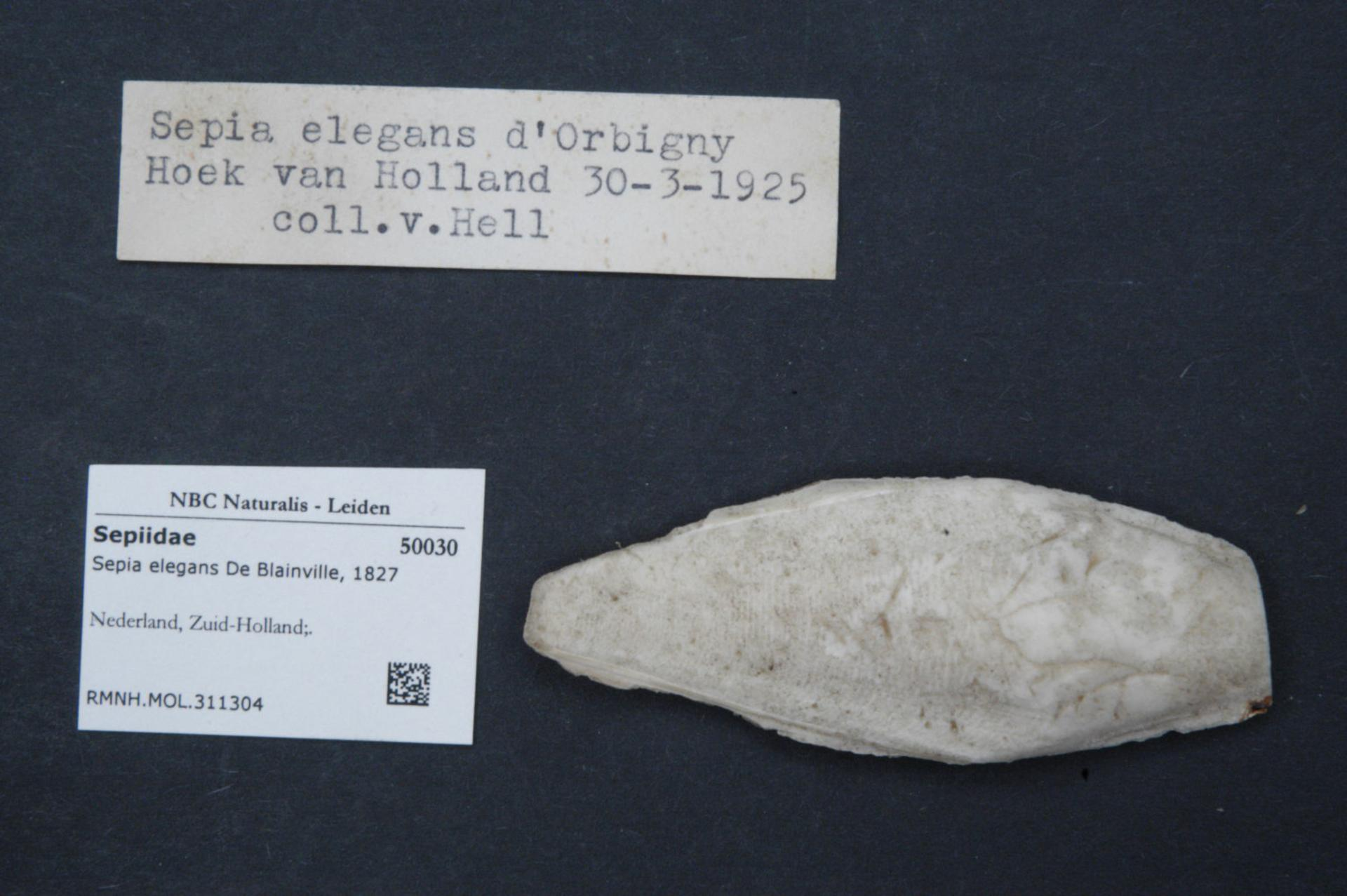
Naturalis Biodiversity Center - RMNH.MOL.311304 - Sepia elegans De Blainville, 1827 - Sepiidae - Mollusc shell

The cuttlebone is lanceolate in shape and has a very small spine, resembling a small calcareous ridge rather than a true spine. Males have a cuttlebone which is 23-33% of its length whereas in females it is 26-35 % its length. The posterior portion of the bone narrows before a blunt, rounded posterior tip.

== Distribution ==
Rhombosepion elegans is found in the eastern Atlantic and the Mediterranean Sea from the Shetland Islands, Scotland in the north south along the eastern shore of the Atlantic in Europe and Africa to 15°S and possibly to the Agulhas Bank. In the Mediterranean Sea its range encompasses the Ligurian Sea, Tyrrhenian Sea, Aegean Sea, Sea of Marmara and Levantine Sea. The habitat of the elegant cuttlefish is extensive as it has been found in the Mediterranean Sea, the Black Sea, as well as the northeast, southeast, and eastern central areas of the Atlantic.

== Diet ==
While crustaceans are the main food source of Rhombosepion elegans, they also eat bony fish, as well as marine worms, such as Polychaeta. The preferred prey of this species of cuttlefish tends to remain constant throughout its lifetime.

== Habitat and ecology ==
Rhombosepion elegans occurs offshore on sandy and muddy substrates, as deep as 500m but it is very rare at depth greater than 450m. It is a sublittoral cuttlefish which spends the winter months in deeper water, at depths between 200m and 400m and in the spring it migrates into shallower water to spawn. Like other cuttlefish it is an opportunistic predator and its main prey are molluscs, small crustaceans, fish and polychaete worms. There does not appear to be any difference in prey choice between the sexes but the males and females feed at different rates. It can tolerate a wide range of salinities, occurring in brackish waters on the Sea of Marmara.

Mature males and females are recorded all year in the Mediterranean Sea and this suggests that in this sea spawning is continuous with a resultant continuous recruitment of adult cuttlefish, with distinct peaks in some areas. The smallest sexually mature males recorded have been 20mm in mantle length and mature females at 30mm, off West Africa maturity is reached at around 1 year of age. In the Aegean Sea however the minimum mantle length for mature males and females was 41mm and 42mm respectively. The females lay eggs in clusters of 12-25 eggs which are attached to sea fans, shells and other hard objects in areas with a muddy substrate. The newly hatched juveniles have a benthic habit and, in the Sicilian Channel estimated grow rates measured by the increase in mantle length was recorded as roughly 2.8mm a month for males and 3.0mm for females. Females are usually heavier than males of similar mantle length and they have longer tentacular clubs and a greater weight of stomach contents. In the Atlantic off west Africa they also spawn throughout the year in shallow inshore waters, but there are peaks of spawning in the summer and autumn. Males bear 95 spermatophores while the females hold approximately 250 eggs. These cuttlefish spawn when the water temperature reaches 13° to 18 °C. In Portuguese waters there are mature cuttlefish found throughout the years although numbers reduce during the summer. In the eastern Mediterranean S. elegans adult individuals were smaller than those in the western part of the sea where lower productivity and higher temperatures cause the cuttlefish less metabolic cost. S. elegans lives for between 12 and 18 months.

Chromidina elegans is a species of parasitic ciliate and is a parasite of Rhombosepion elegans.

== Reproduction ==
Females tend to carry approximately 250 eggs, and have a potential fecundity (reproductive rate) of 513 to 1190, while males can have about 95 spermatophores. Eggs are released in shallow watered sea fans, shells, and rocks within small bundles. The elegant cuttlefish are sexually dimorphic, the females have more body weight per given length, while males tend to be slightly larger in size. The females of this species also have longer tentacular clubs.

== Fisheries and other human uses ==
Rhombosepion elegans is sometimes caught as bycatch high numbers in parts of its geographic range. In the Mediterranean Sea it can be an important species in local markets and it is fished for intensively in the Sicilian Channel whilein the south-western Adriatic it as bycatch in a multi-species trawl fishery together with Sepia orbignyana. The catch of these cuttlefish was reduced between 1984 and 1999 and almost none were caught in a day's fishing in 2003, the decline being attributed to overfishing. This species, mixed with S. orbignyana and smaller sized S. officinalis in both fresh and frozen forms. The primary threat for all cuttlefish species is ocean acidification, which directly affects the density of the developing cuttlebone. The higher concentration of carbon dioxide in the atmosphere is found to increase the density of a cuttlebone which then negatively affects the buoyancy of the cuttlefish. It is also common for the cuttlefish to be caught as bycatch, often in significant numbers. Rhombosepion elegans is overfished in some places, especially in the Sicilian Channel where they are often used as a food source and their cuttlebones used for metal casting.
