= Hyalophysa chattoni =

Scientific classification
- Domain: Eukaryota
- Clade: Diaphoretickes
- Clade: SAR
- Clade: Alveolata
- Phylum: Ciliophora
- Class: Oligohymenophorea
- Order: Apostomatida
- Family: Foettingeriidae
- Genus: Hyalophysa
- Species: H. chattoni

Binomial name
- Hyalophysa chattoni Bradbury, 1966

Species of single-celled organism

Hyalophysa chattoni is an apostome ciliate of the order Apostomatida. The polymorphic symbiont is carried as an encysted phoront on the exoskeleton of few arthropods belonging to the subphylum Crustacea and undergoes metamorphosis during the host's premolt followed by various other life-cycle stages.
