= Judiciary of Israel =

Part of the article of the series of government of Israel

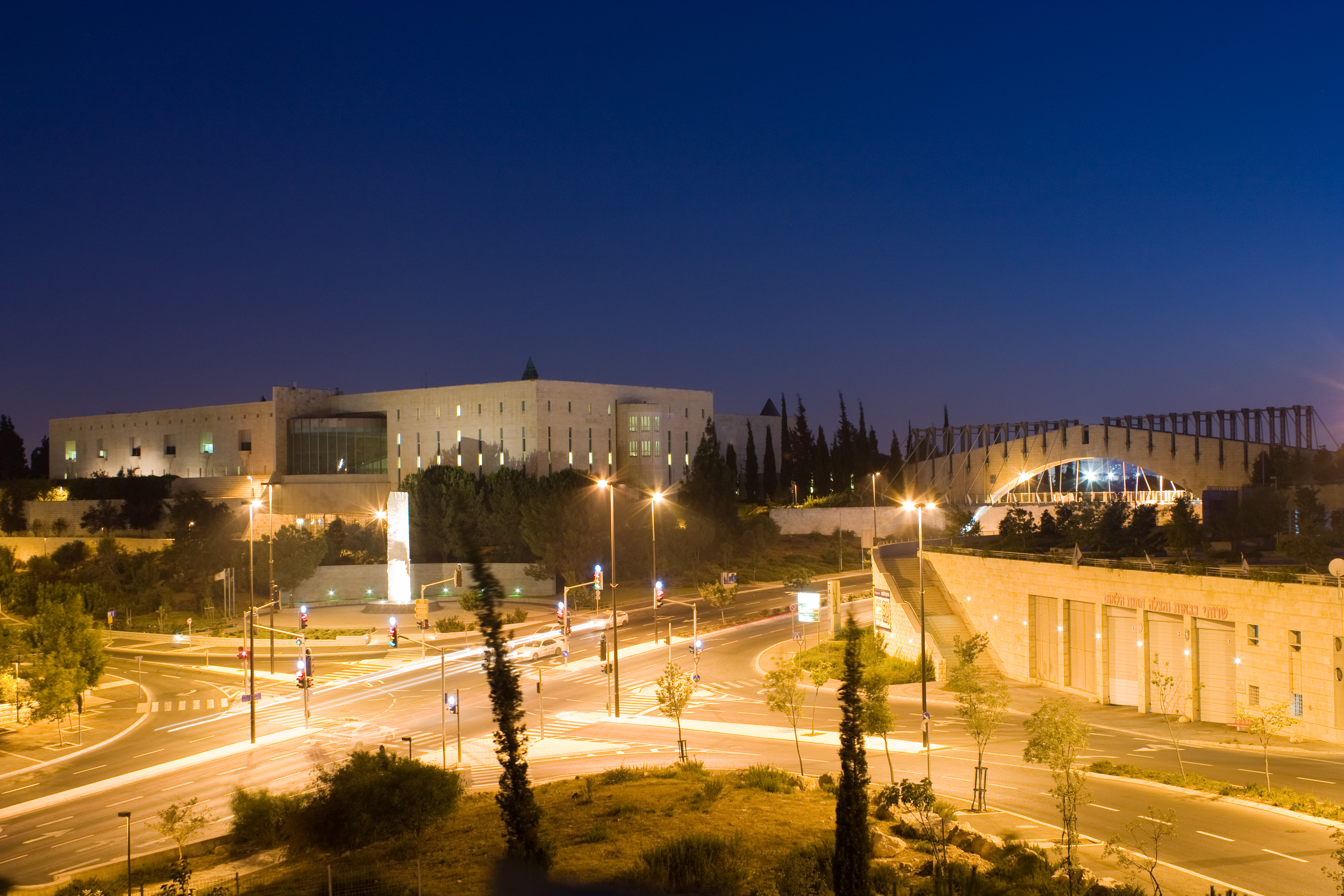
Israeli Supreme Court at night

The judicial system of Israel consists of secular courts and religious courts. The law courts constitute a separate and independent unit of Israel's Ministry of Justice. The system is headed by the President of the Supreme Court and the Minister of Justice.

Religious courts include Jewish batei din, Islamic courts, Druze courts, and courts for ten recognized Christian communities. However, religious courts wield extremely limited authority, and they are engaged with for marital affairs, as no non-religious form of marriage performed in Israel is recognized legally.

== Criminal and civil courts ==
=== Supreme Court ===
Located in Jerusalem, the Supreme Court has ultimate appellate jurisdiction over all other civil and military courts, and in some cases original jurisdiction in criminal and civil cases. As an appellate court, it considers appeals on judgement and other decisions by the district courts, and in rare cases it takes appeals from the labor and military court systems. It also considers appeals on a judicial and quasi-judicial cases of various kinds, such as matters relating to the legality of Knesset elections and disciplinary rulings of the Bar Association. Sitting as the High Court of Justice, it acts as a court of first instance, often in matters concerning the legality of decisions regarding state authorities. The High Court of Justice or otherwise the Israeli Supreme Court acts sometimes not as an appellate body to the district court but as an overseer of justice against the lower courts.

=== District courts ===
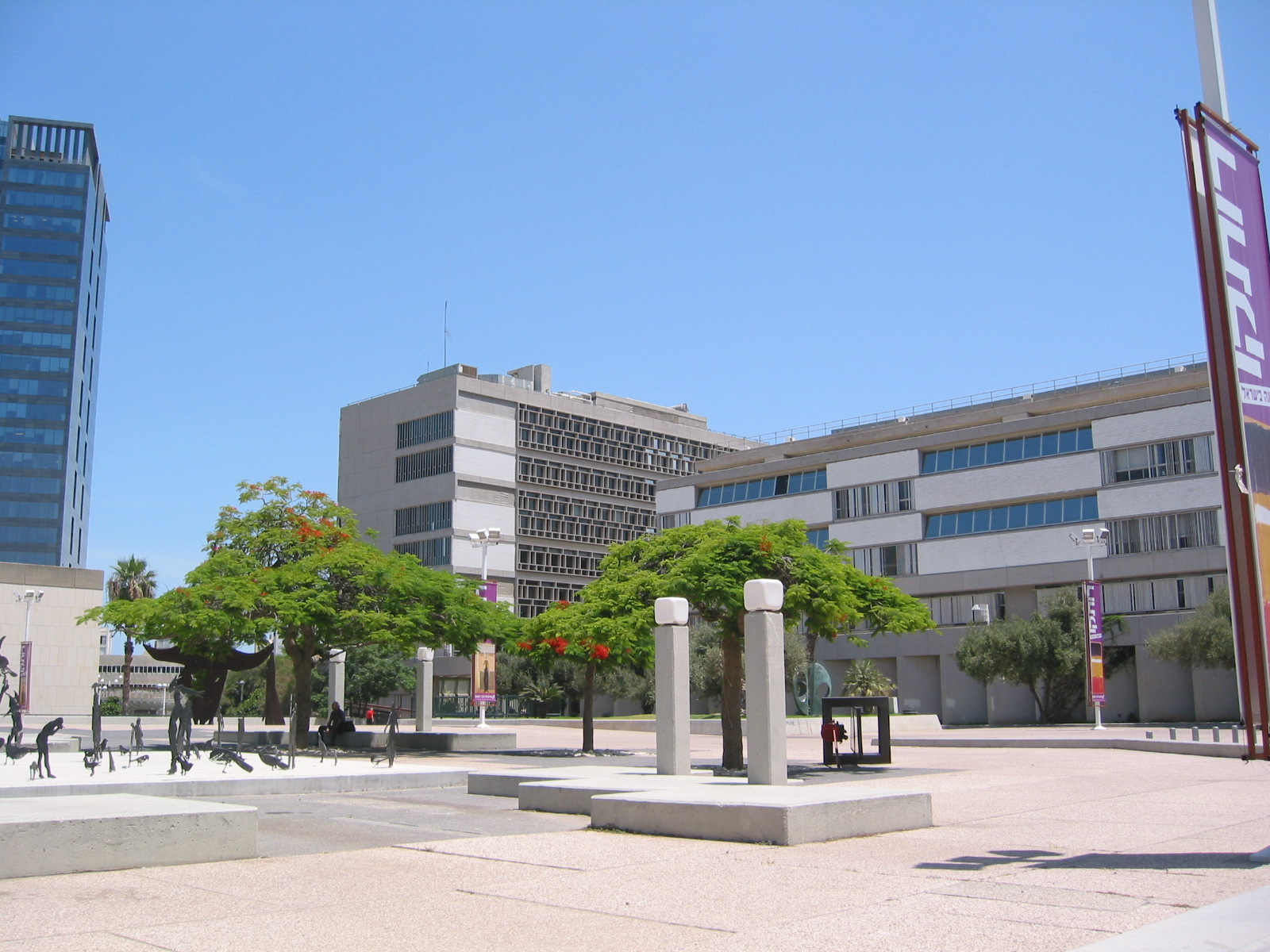
Tel Aviv District Court

The district courts constitute the middle level courts of the judicial system, and have jurisdiction in any matter not within the sole jurisdiction of another court. In criminal matters, the courts have jurisdiction over cases where the accused faces a penalty of at least seven years imprisonment. In civil cases, they have jurisdiction over cases in which more than two and a half million shekels are in dispute. District courts also hear appeals of judgments of the magistrate courts, as well as cases involving companies and partnership, arbitration, prisoners petitions, and appeals on tax matters. Sitting as courts for administrative matters, they can hear petitions against arms of the government. One also sits as the court of admiralty, hearing all cases involving shipping commerce, accidents on the sea and the like. Most cases are heard by a single judge, though the court president can choose to appoint a three-judge panel. Cases where the accused is charged with an offense punishable by at least ten years in prison and appeals from magistrate courts are heard by three-judge panels. There are six such courts, one in each district of Israel.

=== Magistrate courts ===
The Magistrate courts serve as basic trial courts. In criminal matters, they hear cases where the accused faces up to seven years imprisonment, and in civil cases, have jurisdiction over matters up to two and a half million shekels. They have jurisdiction over the use and possession of real property. The courts also act as traffic courts, municipal courts and family courts. Sitting as small-claims courts, they have jurisdiction over cases involving claims up to 30,000 shekels. Rather than following standard evidentiary rules, they require extensive pleadings and documentation upon filing of a formally written complaint. Verdicts are expected seven days from trial. Cases are heard by a single judge unless the court president decides to appoint a three-judge panel. There are 30 magistrate courts.

=== Labor courts ===
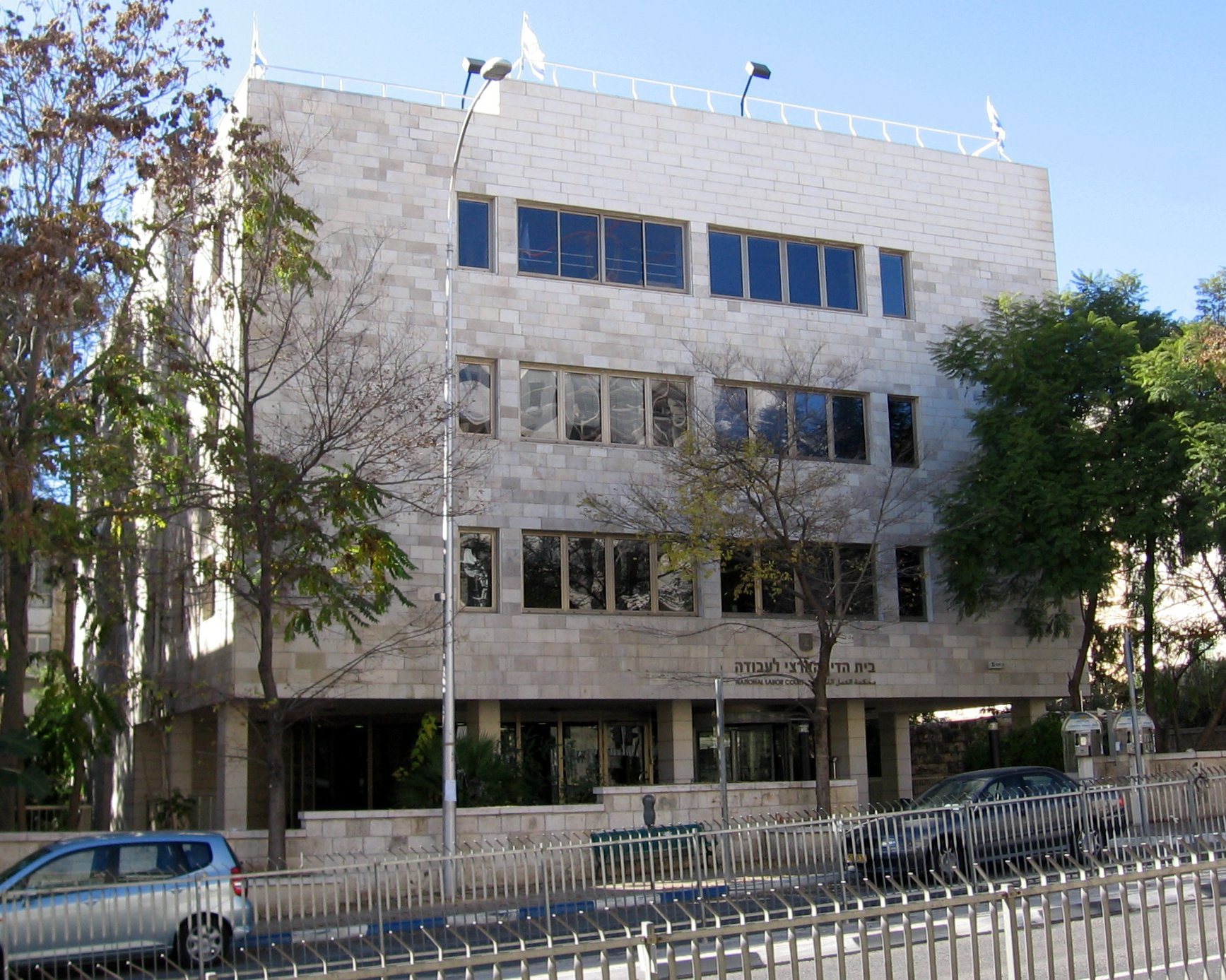
National Labor Court, Jerusalem

There are five Regional Labor Courts in Israel acting as tribunals of first instance, and a National Labor Court in Jerusalem which hears appeals from the regional courts, as well as a few cases of national importance as a court of first instance. Civil cases in Regional Labor Courts are typically heard by three judges consisting of one professional judge and two lay judges, one of whom has experience in the labor sector and another who has experience in management. The courts are not bound by the rules of evidence in such cases. Appeals to the National Labor Court are heard by five judges, three professional judges and two lay judges. In rare instances, a ruling from the National Labor Court can be further appealed to the Supreme Court. They are vested with exclusive jurisdiction over cases involving employer-employee relationship, pre-employment, post-employment strikes and labor union disputes, as well as labor related complaints against the National Insurance Institute, and claims under the National Health Insurance Law.

The Labor Courts Law sets forth those matters within the jurisdiction of the Labor Court. Substantially all causes of action arising from the employer-employee relationship are within the court's jurisdiction.

=== Military courts ===
In the Israel Defense Forces, a legal system separate from the civilian legal system is maintained. It is overseen by the Military Advocate General, and has a system of military courts to try soldiers for criminal offenses and deal with criminal and security cases in the Israeli-occupied territories. All three of Israel's military districts, the ground, air, and maritime branches of the military, the Home Front Command, and the General Staff have military courts. There is also a special military tribunal, and field tribunals can be set up in times of war. The Military Court of Appeals is the supreme military court of Israel. It handles appeals from both the prosecution and defense in lower military courts. In special instances, a decision of the Military Court of Appeals can be further appealed to the Supreme Court, but special permission from the Supreme Court is required, and permission is generally granted only when there is a significant legal issue.

The military courts of first instance are generally composed of a three-judge panel. The head of the panel is a professional judge with a legal education and judicial experience, while the two others are officers who serve in units based in the court's regional district and generally do not have a legal background. Hearings in the Military Court of Appeals are also presided over by three-judge panels, but at least two of the judges must have a legal background, and most judges of the Military Court of Appeals have previous experience sitting in military courts of first instance.

Every defendant facing criminal charges in military court except those appearing for traffic offenses is entitled to legal representation. The Military Defense Council Division provides legal representation to soldiers facing criminal indictment. A soldier facing criminal charges in military court may choose to be represented by a private lawyer instead, but the private lawyer must be certified to appear before military courts.

For less serious offenses, the IDF maintains a disciplinary jurisdiction system. It is responsible for reviewing cases in which the offense is considered light, and is punished with disciplinary action, which is less serious than criminal charges.

=== Migration Tribunals ===
The Population and Migration Tribunals Unit consists of two tribunals – the Appeals Tribunal and the Detention Review Tribunal. The tribunals were founded and are operating under the Entry into Israel Law, 5712-1952, and are designated to serve as an administrative judicial review forum in the matter of the Population and Immigration Authority decisions.

The Appeals tribunal is an administrative tribunal that constitutes a judicial review on decisions made by the Population and Immigration Authority in the matters such as entry to Israel, humanitarian cases, asylum, family reunion, residence and in matters of citizenship, in accordance with the provisions of the Second Schedule to the Entry into Israel Law, 5712-1952. There are four Tribunals, in the following districts: Jerusalem, Tel Aviv and central district, Haifa and north district and Beer Sheva and south district.

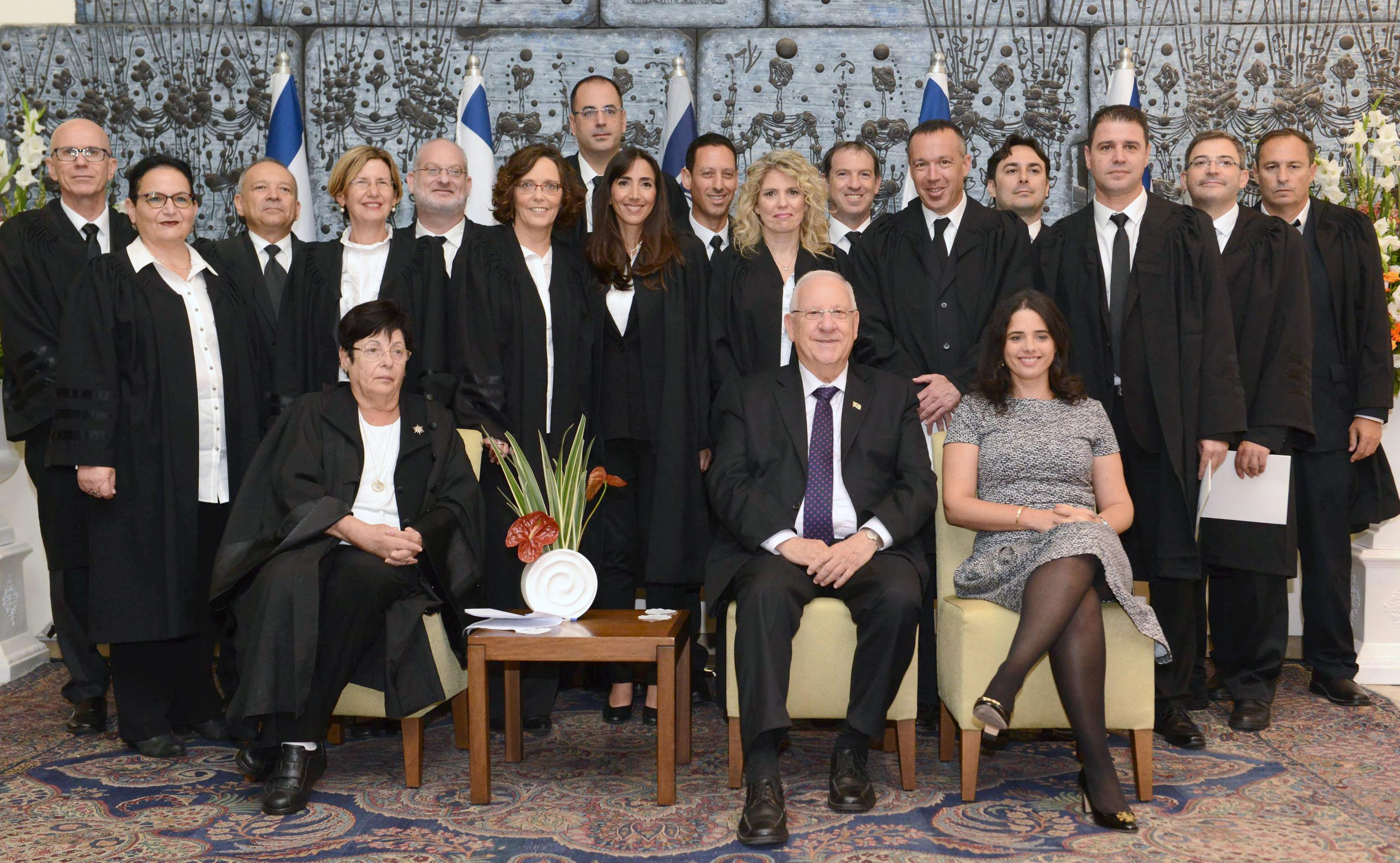
The swearing in ceremony of HaShalom district court judges. Seated in front are the Israeli Supreme Court President, Miriam Naor, the President of Israel, Reuven Rivlin and the Israeli Justice minister Ayelet Shaked. In the background is an Israeli volcanic ash relief.

The role of the Detention Review Tribunal is to examine the legality of holding in detention as soon as possible. Pursuant to the Entry into Israel Law, the tribunal is competent to authorize the detention order, change it or revoke it. The tribunal is competent to order that the detainee be released in return for a bond and to order a change in the conditions of the bond. Pursuant to the Entry into Israel Law, 5712-1952, a detainee should be brought before the Detention Review Tribunal as soon as possible and no later than 96 hours from the decision of the Border Control Officer. In the event that the tribunal has kept a person in detention, the tribunal shall hold a periodical judicial review regarding the continuation of the detention at least every 30 days. The judges who serve in the Detention Review Tribunal hear cases as a single judge in matters of the detainees brought before them.

A judgment of the Population and Miogration Tribunals may be appealed by right in the District Court sitting as an Administrative Matters Court.

== Religious courts ==
Israel maintains a system of religious courts for the Jewish, Muslim, Druze and Christian populations. These courts have jurisdiction over cases such as marital issues, conversion and appointment to religious leadership positions.

=== Jewish courts ===
The Jewish religious courts are known as rabbinical courts. Their judges, known as dayanim, are selected by a committee headed by the Minister of Justice. There are twelve regional rabbinic courts, a special conversion court, and the Great Rabbinical Court which acts as an appellate court. The Great Rabbinical Court is chaired by one of two Chief Rabbis of Israel.

Divorce of a Jewish couple can only be obtained at the Rabbinical Batei Din. However, if a petition for ancillary matrimonial reliefs, such as custody, support or equitable distribution of property is filed with the Civil Courts before a case for divorce is opened at the Batei Din, then all other marital issues may also be taken by Magistrate Courts sitting as Family Courts. Otherwise, if one spouse opens some sort of an action with the Batei Din (including asking the couple for reconciliation), the Batei Din assume that all ancillary relief is aggregated into the main complaint, and the spouses may find themselves facing judicial determination pursuant to Halakha (Jewish religious law), and not pursuant to the secular law. Thus, spouses may lose the equal protection and anti-gender discrimination protections of the secular civil law.

Since the Chief Rabbinate is controlled by Orthodox Jews, other streams such as the Reform and Conservative streams are isolated from official positions. There is also a struggle within the Orthodox world to allow more rabbis to perform marriages and to allow alternative views. The current government has proposed legislation which would enable the Rabbinical court to act as arbitrators in civil issues when both parties so choose, codifying an existing practice.

=== Muslim courts ===
The Islamic courts of Israel are known as Sharia courts. These courts have more control over family affairs than other religious courts do. They are supervised by their own official religious establishments. Their judges, known as qadis, are elected by the Knesset. This is the maintenance of an agreement reached with the British Mandatory Authorities before the State of Israel's establishment in 1948. There are nine regional Sharia courts and the Sharia Court of Appeals.

=== Druze courts ===
The Druze courts have jurisdiction over Israeli Druze in matters of marriage and divorce, and are overseen by the Ministry of Justice. Their judges are known as kadi-madhabs. There are two regional courts and the Druze Court of Appeals.

=== Christian courts ===
The ten recognized Christian communities are the Eastern Orthodox (Greek), Catholic (Latin, Armenian, Syriac, Chaldean, Melkite Greek and Maronite), non-Chalcedonian (Armenian Orthodox and Syriac Orthodox) and Protestant (Evangelical Episcopalian) communities, which have their own courts recognized by the government.

== Criminal and trial procedure ==
=== Investigative and pre-trial procedure ===
The Israel Police is responsible for investigations and arrests regarding civilian crimes. If the Israel Police learns of a possible criminal offense through a complaint by a private citizen or through other evidence, it then decides whether or not to open an investigation. In the case of an offense other than a felony, a police officer with the rank of captain or higher is entitled to order that no investigation take place if the officer is of the opinion that no public interest is involved or another authority is legally competent to carry out the investigation. During a police investigation, a judge must issue a search warrant for police to search a home or review computer material, though a police officer may search a home without a warrant if there are reasonable grounds to assume a felony is being committed there or was recently committed there. Any search either with or without a warrant must be conducted in the presence of two witnesses who are not police officers unless the circumstances and urgency of the case do not allow it, a judge permitted it, or the owner of the property or one of the household members requested that it not be conducted in the presence of witnesses. If the police wish to arrest a suspect following an investigation, an arrest warrant must be obtained from a judge. The police must present evidence to the judge, who will issue a warrant only if satisfied that there is reasonable suspicion that the person committed an offense. A police officer is entitled to carry out an arrest without a warrant if there are reasonable grounds to suspect that the suspect committed an offense and if one of the following conditions are met: the suspected offense was committed in the officer's presence or in the recent past, there is a reasonable suspicion that the suspect will not appear for investigative procedures, there is reasonable suspicion that the suspect will disrupt trial proceedings, there is reasonable suspicion that the suspect's continued freedom will constitute a danger to the public, committed a select number of serious violent crimes, drug crimes, or security crimes, or there are reasonable grounds to suspect a suspect violated bail or escaped lawful custody.

A suspect arrested in Israel must be informed or the reason for the arrest and be provided with a copy of the arrest warrant if there is one. Following an arrest without a warrant, the suspect must be brought to the commanding officer of the police station, who determines if there was reasonable cause for the arrest and if further detention is required. If a suspect was arrested without a warrant, and to extend detention regardless of whether or not a warrant was issued, a detainee must be brought before a magistrate judge within 24 hours of the arrest, or 12 hours if the suspect is a minor, though if the Sabbath or a public holiday make it impossible to bring the suspect before a judge within that period of time, the detainee must be brought before a judge no later than 4 hours after the end of the Sabbath or holiday. A court may extend the detention period to up to 15 days at a time, though in practice it is usually extended by 5 days at a time. Israeli law allows a suspect to be held up to 30 days before charges are filed, and with the consent of the Attorney General or can be extended to 75 days. A Supreme Court judge may order further 90-day extensions, though in practice this is rare.

Suspects are typically interrogated by police. Though police are allowed to lie to a suspect during interrogation, anyone facing police interrogation has the right to consult a lawyer, and an interrogating officer must warn the suspect that they do not have to say anything self-incriminating, and that anything said might be used against them in court. Following the investigation, the police decide on whether to close the file or to issue a recommendation to prosecute. Usually, the branch of the State Attorney's Office in the relevant district will decide on whether to file charges or not, though in certain special circumstances a district prosecutor's decision to indict requires the approval of the Attorney General, and the Attorney General decides on whether to indict elected officials. A decision not to indict by a district prosecutor can be appealed to the level of the State Attorney's Office, the Attorney General, or the Supreme Court. After prosecutors decide to file criminal charges, the accused has the right to a preliminary hearing to attempt to convince the prosecution not to press charges, which must take place within 30 days of the decision. Typically, the accused submits a written appeal which is reviewed by the prosecution though in some circumstances it can be done in person. However, anyone who exercised the right to silence in withholding information from the police during interrogation may not then use any of the information that was withheld in their hearing. The prosecution then decides on whether to drop the charges or go to trial. Following an indictment, if the accused is charged with an offense carrying a penalty greater than three months imprisonment, the accused gains access to the investigation material to enable preparation of a defense in court.

Administrative detention and closed trials are allowed in cases involving security and illegal immigration. Anyone subjected to administrative detention and a possible closed trial has the right to be represented by counsel, and may appeal their detention to the Supreme Court. The burden of proof rests on the prosecution to prove that closed proceedings are necessary.

The vast majority of criminal cases investigated by police and considered for indictment are closed due to lack of evidence or lack of public interest. Of those cases that do go to court, over 85% end with a plea bargain, where the defendant pleads guilty in exchange for a lighter sentence. Even if the suspect confesses to his or her crime and pleads guilty at their court arraignment, they will still receive a trial to determine the penalty to be imposed upon them.

Criminal investigations within the Israeli military are carried out by the Military Police Corps. The investigative branch of the Military Police Corps is an independent unit not subordinate to any military command. The authority to open a criminal investigation within the IDF rests independently with the Military Advocate General, the head of the Military Police Corps investigative branch, and the Command General, each according to their own discretion. Misdemeanors are investigated by regular IDF officers outside the Military Police, while more serious offenses are subject to Military Police investigation. Evidence gathered during a criminal investigation is transferred to the Military Advocate General's Corps, which is composed of legal officers who review the evidence and decide whether to file an indictment, transfer the case to disciplinary jurisdiction, or close the case.

=== Trial procedure ===
Israel is unusual among common-law derived systems due to the absence of juries in its legal system. All criminal and civil trials in Israel are conducted before professional judges, who act as the triers of fact as well as the triers of law. Most cases are presided over by a single judge, while criminal cases for offenses punishable by at least 10 years imprisonment are usually heard by three-judge panels, including one presiding judge. In trials heard before three-judge panels, unanimity is not required for conviction. Judges may convict a defendant with a 2-1 majority verdict. Criminal and civil appeals are also presided over by three-judge panels. Although trial procedure is primarily based on the adversarial system, where the defense and prosecution conduct the trial with judges observing, it also incorporates elements of the inquisitorial system, where judges take an active role in the trial proceedings. Everyone accused of a criminal offense has the right to be represented by counsel, and if the accused cannot afford private counsel, they are entitled to representation by counsel from the Public Defense, a unit of the Ministry of Justice, if they meet the criteria. All defendants charged with a crime punishable by at least 10 years imprisonment, indigent defendants charged with a crime punishable by at least 5 years imprisonment, juveniles, and the disabled are entitled to representation from the public defense. Prosecutions are handled by the State Attorney's Office, which consists of a central bureau and eight regional offices. Criminal defendants enjoy the presumption of innocence, with the burden of proof falling on the prosecution.

Every trial starts with a procedure referred to as the reading, where the presiding judge will read the charges to the defendant and then ask the defendant to confirm understanding of the charges. If deemed necessary, the court will further explain the charges to the defendant, but will refrain if the defense counsel explained the charges to the defendant. Then, if the defendant and prosecution consent and if the defendant has legal representation, the court will conduct a preliminary hearing, during which it can clarify whether the defendant admits or denies the charges, examine the possibility of narrowing disagreements between the prosecution and defense regarding the facts or legal issues of the case, and inspect the investigation materials. Following that, the prosecution and defense begin to argue their cases. At any time after the commencement of trial proceedings and at any stage of them, the court may - if the defendant has legal representation - summon the defendant and his or her defense counsel and the prosecutor to ascertain whether they agree upon a point of fact or admissibility of a piece of evidence. After trial proceedings begin, a defendant is entitled to make preliminary pleadings to the court regarding a lack of jurisdiction or an invalidating feature of the indictment, or charge that the facts alleged in the indictment do not constitute an offense. After a preliminary claim is made, the court may reject the claim or give the prosecution an opportunity to respond to the claim before reaching a decision. If the preliminary claim is accepted the court may amend the indictment, dismiss the charges, or transfer the matter to another court.

In trial proceedings, the prosecution presents its case first, and is entitled to make an opening statement. The prosecution will present the evidence and then announce that its case is closed. If the court decides that the prosecution has failed to present prima facie evidence of guilt, the defendant will be acquitted, though not before the prosecution is allowed to challenge the decision to acquit. Otherwise, the defense will argue its case. As with the prosecution, the defense is entitled to make an opening statement, and then presents its evidence, after which it will close its case. The prosecution is then entitled to present additional evidence arising from evidence presented by the defense which the prosecution could not have foreseen, or to prove facts to which the defendant withdrew admission to after the closure of the prosecution's case. If the prosecution presents additional evidence, the defense is entitled to then present evidence to rebut it. During proceedings, when the prosecution and defense present witnesses to argue in their favor, the opposing party is entitled to cross-examine the witness after first being examined by the party who called him or her. After both parties have finished examining the witness, the court may examine the witness, and judges are also entitled to pose a question to the witness during examination by either of the parties to clarify a point arising from it. If the court has examined a witness, both the prosecution and defense may then further examine him or her to determine a point that arose in the questioning by the court. A defendant is entitled to testify as a witness for the defense, subject to cross-examination by the prosecution, though the defendant may not be cross-examined on any previous criminal convictions unless the defendant has claimed to be of good character during testimony or otherwise produced evidence to that effect. A defendant who elects to testify will usually do so at the commencement of the hearing of the defense's evidence, though the court may permit the defendant to do so at another stage. A defendant may refrain from testifying, but a refusal to testify may add weight to the prosecution's case, though it will not serve as evidence against the defendant if an expert witness testifies that the defendant is a person with mental or psychological disabilities.

When both the prosecution and defense have rested their cases, the court may, upon request of either party or if the court deems it necessary, order the summoning of a witness for further examination, even a witness who was already heard by the court, or the presentation of further evidence. If such further evidence is presented, the prosecution and defense are entitled, with the permission of the court, to present their own evidence to rebut it.

Upon the completion of trial proceedings, the court will then acquit or convict the defendant in a written verdict laying out the reasons for the decision, which will be signed and dated by the judges. The court is entitled to convict a defendant for a crime that the defendant was not charged within the indictment if his or her guilt of that offense became apparent during the trial, though in such a case it must first give the defense a reasonable opportunity to rebut those charges. If the court decides to convict the defendant of an offense that it is not competent to hear a trial on, it will transfer the matter to a district court, which will hear it as if it had been originally brought before it and is entitled to hear it from the stage that the previous court had reached.

If the court convicts a defendant, it will then hold a penalty phase. The prosecution is entitled to bring evidence of any previous convictions the defendant has, and if the defendant is convicted of a violent crime or sex crime, the court may instruct a public servant from the Ministry of Welfare and Social Services to provide a report on the status of and harm done to the victim or victims of the crime, or of the victims' family if the defendant committed an offense which resulted in the death of a person. Once the prosecution has presented evidence in the penalty phase, or if it has not presented evidence, the defense may then present evidence of mitigating circumstances, during which the defendant may make a statement without being examined. The court is entitled, after giving the defendant an opportunity to be heard in the matter, to order that the defendant be examined by a physician or other expert, and to order any other investigations deemed expedient to determining the sentence. At the closure of arguments in the penalty phase, the prosecution and subsequently the defense are entitled to make final arguments regarding the penalty of the defendant. The court may also revoke a conviction if it determines that there is reason to sentence the defendant to probation or community service without a conviction. Upon completion of the proceedings, the court will pass sentence in a public reading and issue a written order signed and dated by the judge or judges.

Following a verdict, the defense has the right to appeal a conviction and a sentence it argues is unduly harsh, and the prosecution may appeal an acquittal and a sentence it argues is unduly lenient. Appeals must be filed within 45 days from the date of judgement, though the period may be extended by the court at the request of the appellant. Israeli law provides that any sentence of death will be automatically subject to appeal proceedings even if the defendant has not appealed against it. The court hearing the appeal may overturn a conviction or acquittal, convict the defendant of a different offense than the lower court had originally convicted him or her of after giving the defense a reasonable opportunity to rebut the decision, increase a sentence only if the prosecution appealed the leniency of the sentence, or dismiss the appeal. Israeli law also provides for the possibility to ask the Supreme Court for a new trial, though it is very rare to be granted a retrial. Between 1948 and 2012, only 21 criminal cases were granted a retrial, about half of which ended in reconfirmation of a defendant's guilt.

== Judicial selection ==
Judges who serve on the Supreme Court, as well as the district and magistrate courts, are appointed by the Judicial Selection Committee, which consists of nine members: the Minister of Justice, another cabinet member, two Knesset members (in practice one is from the coalition and the other is from the opposition), two members of the Israel Bar Association, and the President of the Supreme Court and two other Supreme Court justices. The committee is chaired by the Minister of Justice. It can appoint judges to the magistrate and district courts by a majority vote, but appointing a Supreme Court judge requires a majority of at least 7 to 9 or two less than the number present at the meeting.

To become a magistrate judge, a candidate must have at least three years of professional legal experience as an attorney, serving a legal function in the service of the state, or teaching law. Candidates for appointment to be a district judge must have at least four years of experience as a magistrate judge or at least six years of professional legal experience. Candidates for appointment to the Supreme Court must have at least five years of experience as a district judge or ten years of professional experience including at least five years in Israel. A person who is recognized as an "eminent jurist" may also be appointed to the Supreme Court, though this special category has been used only once for an appointment.

The current government in Israel has proposed a Bill that would change the constitution and voting rules of this Committee, such that the government would have the voting majority and thus ability to appoint and dismiss all judges.

== Legal practice ==
All lawyers in Israel must receive a license to practice law and be admitted to the Israel Bar Association to practice law. To practice law, a lawyer must go through a three-step process. They must first obtain a law degree from an educational institution recognized by the Law Faculty of the Hebrew University of Jerusalem, or alternatively, those moving to Israel and not holding a law degree from a recognized institution in Israel must have at least two years' practical experience as an attorney or judge in their country of origin. They then must take a Hebrew proficiency examination and examinations on eight separate areas of law: obligations and labor law, property law, family and succession law, criminal law and procedure, civil procedure and professional ethics, constitutional and administration law, commercial law on corporations, partnerships, and other associations, and commercial law on bankruptcy, liquidations, bills, exchange, and tax law.

After passing these exams, candidates must serve as an articled clerk of twelve months, at least 36 hours a week, 25 of which must be worked before 2:00 PM on that day. After serving their articles, candidates must pass the final examinations, which consist of a written examination and an oral examination before three judges. Candidates who arrived from abroad, have at least five years of professional legal experience, and began their articles within ten years of arriving in Israel are exempt from the final examinations. The final examinations deal with court procedure, procedure for registering land rights in real estate, procedure for registering corporations, partnerships, and liquidations, interpretation of laws and judicial documents, professional ethics, evidence, and recent changes in case law and legislation. Those who pass the written examination may take the oral examination. If they pass, they are admitted to the Israel Bar Association and given licenses to practice law.

As of 2012, there are 52,142 active lawyers in Israel, making it the country with the highest number of active lawyers per capita in the world. Law schools produce new graduates at the rate of 2,000 new lawyers a year. This creates a tight and highly competitive market.

== See also ==
- Israeli law
- 2023 Israeli judicial reform
- International Criminal Court investigation in Palestine
