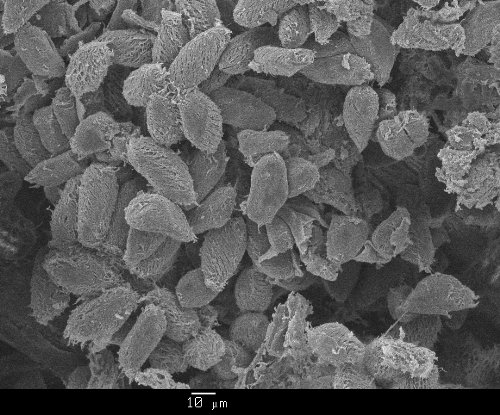
- SEM image of parasitoid ciliates of the genus Collinia

Scientific classification
- Domain: Eukaryota
- Supergroup: Alveolata
- Phylum: Ciliophora
- Class: Oligohymenophorea
- Order: Apostomatida
- Family: Colliniidae
- Genus: Collinia; Cépède, 1910

Species
- Collinia circulans; Collinia oregonensis

= Collinia =

Genus of single-celled organisms

Collinia is a genus of parasitoid ciliates of the Colliniidae family.
