= Lisa Levin =

American marine ecologist

Lisa A. Levin
- Education: Radcliffe College; Scripps Institution of Oceanography
- Scientific career
- Workplaces: North Carolina State University (1983-1992); Scripps Institution of Oceanography (1992-Present)
- Doctoral advisor: Paul K. Dayton
- Website: levin.ucsd.edu

Lisa A. Levin is a Distinguished Professor of biological oceanography and marine ecology at the Scripps Institution of Oceanography. She holds the Elizabeth Hamman and Morgan Dene Oliver Chair in Marine Biodiversity and Conservation Science. She studies coastal and deep-sea ecosystems and is a Fellow of the American Association for the Advancement of Science.

== Early life and education ==
Levin grew up in Los Angeles. She went on to complete her B.A. degree summa cum laude in Biology at Radcliffe College in 1975. She joined the Scripps Institution of Oceanography for her graduate studies, earning a PhD in Oceanography from the University of California, San Diego in 1982. Her PhD advisor was Paul K. Dayton. Her dissertation was on tidal flat ecology and deep-sea sediments. Her postdoctoral advisors were Rudolph Scheltema and Hal Caswell at the Woods Hole Oceanographic Institution.

== Research ==
She joined North Carolina State University as an assistant professor in 1983. Levin then moved to the Scripps Institution of Oceanography in 1992 as an associate professor. In the mid-1990s she became interested in deep-sea environments, including methane seeps and oxygen minimum zones. These are the regions of ocean that were deprived of oxygen – between 200 and 1,000 metres deep with less than 90% of the surface oxygen. Her work also considers the structure of vulnerable ecosystems, wetland biotic interactions and larval ecology of coastal marine populations. She has worked extensively in the Pacific, Indian and Atlantic Oceans using a range of deep-sea equipment including submersibles, remotely operated underwater vehicles. She has participated in over 40 oceanographic expeditions. She monitored cold seep sediments, checking the interaction of fauna with flow and reporting the first review of the different size groups of organisms.

Together with her students, Levin has worked with a broad range of taxa, from microbes and microalgae to invertebrates, fishes and whales. Her recent research has emphasized 3 major themes:

- the structure, function and vulnerability of continental margin ecosystems, particularly those subject to oxygen and sulphide stress, ocean acidification and ocean deoxygenation
- wetland biotic interactions as they mediate marsh function, invasion and restoration
- larval ecology of coastal marine populations with emphasis on connectivity.

She served on the San Diego Wetlands Advisory Board. She was an editor of the journal Marine Ecology and founding editorial board member of the Annual Review of Marine Science. She joined the UNESCO Intergovernmental Oceanographic Commission in 2000. She reported massive single-cell xenophyophores in the Mariana Trench in 2011.

In 2011 she was made the director of the Center for Marine Biodiversity and Conservation, which she led for six years. She was made the Intergovernmental Oceanographic Commission Anton Bruun Memorial Lecturer. She gave the Sverdrup Lecture at the 2012 American Geophysical Union Meeting. She was made a Fellow of the American Geophysical Union in 2013. She co-founded the Deep-Ocean Stewardship Initiative (DOSI), a group that seeks to integrate science, technology, policy, law and economics to advise on the management of resource use in the deep ocean in order to maintain the integrity of deep-ocean ecosystems. In 2017 she founded the Deep Ocean Observing Strategy (DOOS), which outlines the requirements for future deep ocean observations.

In 2016 she spoke at the 2016 United Nations Climate Change Conference. She is interested in the ethical challenges of mining the deep sea for metals. She was part of the 2018 World Economic Forum, speaking about the dangers of mining the deep sea bed. She was awarded the Association for the Sciences of Limnology and Oceanography (ASLO) A.C. Redfield Lifetime Achievement Award in 2018. and the Prince Albert 1 Grand Medal in Science in 2019. She has published over 280 papers that have been cited more than 30,000 times. In 2024 Levin was elected to the National Academy of Sciences.
