= Jack Vallentyne =

Canadian biochemist (1926-2007)

Jack Vallentyne (31 July 1926 - 16 June 2007) was a Canadian biochemist and the 2001 recipient of the A.C. Redfield Lifetime Achievement Award.

== Background ==
Born in Toronto, Vallentyne completed his undergraduate studies in Biology and Chemistry at Queen's University at Kingston (1945–49). He earned his Ph.D. in Paleo-Limnology at Yale University (1949–52) under the supervision of George Evelyn Hutchinson. From 1943 to 1945 Vallentyne had served in the military. He and his wife Ann had five children: Peter, Stephen, Jane, Anne Marie, and Geoffrey.

== Academic positions ==
Vallentyne held a variety of academic positions throughout his lifetime. Between 1952 and 1955, he was a lecturer and then assistant professor (between 1955 and 1958) in Biology at Queen’s University. Other positions he held included: Fellow of the Carnegie Institution of Washington Geophysical Laboratory (from 1956 to 1957), associate professor and full professor of Zoology at Cornell University (from 1958 to 1966), a Guggenheim Fellow for Biogeochemical studies at the Pallanza Institute (from 1964 to 1965), Vice President of ASLO in (between 1964 and 1965), president of SIL (from 1974 to 198), and a senior scientific advisor of ocean and aquatic sciences, and science advisor to the Fisheries Research Board of Canada (between 1975 and 1977), and a senior scientist at the Department of Fisheries & Oceans in the Canadian Center for Inland Waters (CCIW) in Burlington, between 1977 and 1992, where he set up a Fisheries Research Board detachment. During his time at his last position, he held the role of Canadian co-chairman at the International Joint Commission Great Lakes Science Advisory Board (between 1986 and 1991).

After his retirement, Vallentyne was nominated scientist emeritus in the Department of Fisheries and Oceans in CCIW.

== Other achievements ==
In July 1980, Vallentyne established the Johnny Biosphere project, in light of the earth’s environmental problems, seeking to encourage future generations to take on this important role. The message to the kids Johnny Biosphere (aka Jack Vallentyne) visited was simple: "Be kind to the Earth and it will be kind to you."

== Publications ==
Some of Vallentyne’s publications include: ‘Tragedy in Mouse Utopia: An Ecological Commentary on Human Utopia,’ (Trafford Publishers). ‘The Algal Bowl,’ (University of Alberta Press), published posthumously, was translated to several languages and became a bestseller, contributing to the wake-up on the causes and consequences of lake deterioration. Vallentyne also worked on the revision of the ‘Great Lakes Water Quality Agreement’ (GLWQA) by developing and implementing the "ecosystem approach" to research and environmental conservation.

== Awards and recognition ==
In 1992 Vallentyne received the Rachel Carson Award for raising public awareness of science from the Society of Environmental Toxicology and Chemistry.

In 2001, he received the A.C. Redfield Lifetime Achievement Award "for his exemplary research contributions in paleolimnology, biogeochemistry and eutrophication; outstanding administrative accomplishments in forming and fostering the Experimental Lakes Area; and passionate efforts in educating children in environmental, ecological and limnological issues."

== Legacy ==
On June 16, 2007, Vallentyne died, aged 80, in Hamilton (Canada).

According to Andrew L. Hamilton, he was grateful that he was able to "watch and marvel at many of his extraordinary contributions to freshwater research and to the development and implementation of the Great Lakes Water Quality Agreement between Canada and the United States."

Dolors Planas said: "We will remember Jack Vallentyne with his Terrestrial Globe on his shoulders, asking to the uninitiated the question ‘Have you been good to your ecosystem today?’"

Charles R. Goldman said, "Coupled with Jack’s natural grace and qualities of kindness and concern was his extremely interesting family that survived the year in Pallanza in a tiny apartment without a single complaint. A lot of that was of course due to his extremely level minded and talented wife." He added, "His unusual intelligence, his handsome striking appearance and his subtle ever smiling sense of humor was captivating…[he had a] truly refreshing natural enthusiasm about anything he undertook."

In recognition of his contributions to world science, the Aquatic Ecosystem Health & Management Society (AEHMS) established a J. R. Vallentyne Lecture Series in 1997 at its biennial conferences. These lectures are delivered by distinguished scientists.

In 2008, the John R. (Jack) Vallentyne Award was instituted, which "recognizes important and sustained efforts to inform and educate the public and policymakers on Great Lakes issues, thereby raising awareness and support for Great Lakes protection and restoration". It is nominated by the IAGLR Outreach Committee and awarded by the IAGLR Board. Vallentyne himself received the first one posthumously.
