= Public Defense (Israel) =

Israel's public criminal defence service

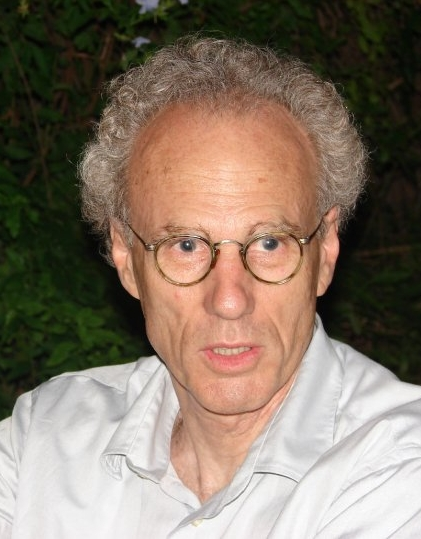
Kenneth Mann, the founding Chief Public Defender

The Public Defense (הסניגוריה הציבורית), also known as the Public Defender's Office, is a unit of the Israeli Ministry of Justice that provides state-funded legal representation to eligible suspects, detainees, defendants and convicted persons. Established in 1996 under the Public Defense Law, 5756–1995, it represents clients during criminal proceedings and in certain related proceedings, including psychiatric proceedings arising from criminal cases.

Eligibility depends on statutory criteria, including the nature of the proceedings, the potential consequences for the person concerned and, in some cases, their financial circumstances. Representation is therefore not restricted to people who cannot afford a private lawyer. Although the state pays public defenders' remuneration and expenses, some clients are required to pay a representation fee.

== History ==
The Public Defense began operating in 1996 following the enactment of the Public Defense Law in 1995. Its first Chief Public Defender was Kenneth Mann, who served from 1996 to 2002.

The first district office covered Tel Aviv and the Central District and began providing services on 16 June 1996, under an order establishing the district office.

Mann was succeeded by Inbal Rubinstein, who served from 2003 to 2012, and subsequently by Yoav Sapir, who served from 2012 to 2021. Anat Meyased-Canaan was selected as Chief Public Defender in September 2021, having previously headed the Haifa district office. In June 2026, her term was extended for a further five years.

== Legal framework and professional duties ==
The Public Defense Law regulates the organisation of the service, the appointment of public defenders and eligibility for representation. District public defenders appoint lawyers and supervise the representation provided within their districts.

Section 15 requires public defenders to act loyally and diligently in their clients' interests and subjects them to the professional ethical rules applicable to lawyers. Where a public defender's obligations to a client conflict with their obligations as a state employee, the obligations to the client take precedence.

Section 13 gives the Chief Public Defender and the service's employees status corresponding to that of the State Attorney and employees of the State Attorney's Office, respectively.

== Eligibility and fees ==
Eligibility is principally governed by section 18 of the Public Defense Law and related legislation. Depending on the applicable provision, entitlement may arise from the seriousness of the charge, the possibility of imprisonment, detention proceedings, the person's age or disability, or financial circumstances.

Applications are considered by the relevant district office. Where financial eligibility must be established, applicants may be required to submit an affidavit and supporting documents. A refusal by a district public defender may be appealed to the Chief Public Defender. Courts also have powers to order the appointment of a public defender.

Some clients must pay a fee under the regulations governing contributions by persons entitled to representation. This payment is distinct from the remuneration paid by the state to the lawyer conducting the case.

== Organisation ==
The service comprises a national headquarters and six district offices, covering Tel Aviv, the Central District, Jerusalem, the Southern District, Haifa and the Northern District.

Representation is provided through a mixed system of salaried state-employed lawyers and private lawyers appointed to act as external public defenders. Lawyers seeking external appointments apply to a district office and provide information about their experience, areas of expertise and availability. Candidates are interviewed according to the service's needs and their qualifications.

According to the State Comptroller, in 2024 the service employed approximately 150 internal public defenders and engaged 758 external lawyers. Its expenditure totalled approximately NIS 283 million, of which around NIS 206 million, or 73 per cent, was allocated to external lawyers' fees.

== Activities ==
=== Representation in criminal proceedings ===
The Public Defense represents eligible clients at successive stages of criminal proceedings, including detention hearings, trials, sentencing and appeals. Its work also includes representation before parole boards and assistance with applications for clemency.

Detainees may request consultation with a public defender before police questioning. The service maintains district arrest departments that respond to requests around the clock and arrange for a lawyer to assess eligibility and provide representation where appropriate.

The service also provides information for minors and their families concerning rights during questioning and detention, and maintains specialised youth departments in its district offices.

=== Psychiatric proceedings ===
The statutory remit includes representation in specified proceedings concerning psychiatric hospitalisation or treatment in connection with criminal cases, as well as certain psychiatric committee hearings and appeals. This entitlement concerns the categories defined by law rather than all persons undergoing involuntary psychiatric hospitalisation.

=== Institutional work and publications ===
In addition to individual representation, the service publishes annual reports describing its legal work and institutional activities. Its report for 2025 marked thirty years of operation and reviewed significant developments in the organisation's history.

Public defenders conduct official visits to prisons and detention facilities and publish findings on conditions of confinement. The service's report covering 2023–2024 described overcrowding, shortages of beds and deficiencies in sanitation and living conditions.

The Public Defense jointly publishes the professional periodical HaSanegor with the legal publisher Skira Mishpatit. It covers substantive criminal law, criminal procedure, evidence, sentencing, detention, juvenile justice and prisoners' rights, and includes articles and summaries of legislation and judgments.

== Scope of representation ==
According to the State Comptroller, the Public Defense represented approximately 63 per cent of defendants in criminal cases opened between 2016 and 2024.

In 2025, the service handled 124,998 proceedings, including 31,677 criminal cases. These figures distinguish criminal cases from the broader total of proceedings handled by the organisation.

== Oversight ==
A State Comptroller audit published in 2026 examined financial eligibility checks, representation fees, supervision of external lawyers and information security. It identified deficiencies in these areas and recommended more consistent supervision procedures, clearer criteria for fee exemptions and improved protection of sensitive client information.

== Chief Public Defenders ==
No.	Name	Term
1	Kenneth Mann	1996–2002
2	Inbal Rubinstein	2003–2012
3	Yoav Sapir	2012–2021
—	Hagit Larnau (acting)	May–September 2021
4	Anat Meyased-Canaan	September 2021–present

Mann, Rubinstein and Sapir's terms are documented in the Ministry of Justice's organisational history. Larnau served as acting head between Sapir's departure and Meyased-Canaan's appointment in 2021. Meyased-Canaan's term was extended in 2026.

== See also ==
- Public defender
- Right to counsel
