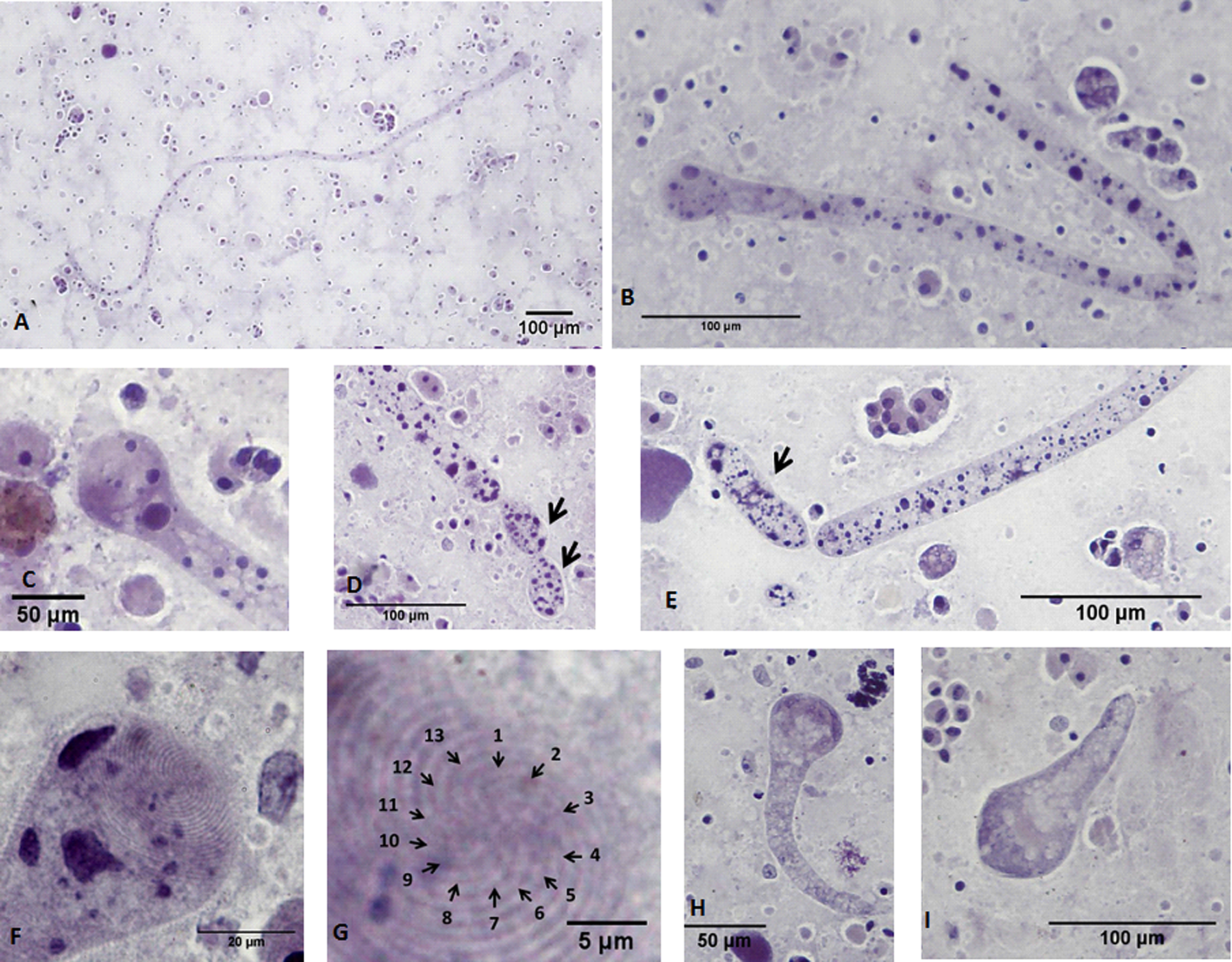
- Chromidina chattoni, hapantotype and parahapantotypes

Scientific classification
- Domain: Eukaryota
- Clade: Sar
- Clade: Alveolata
- Phylum: Ciliophora
- Class: Oligohymenophorea
- Order: Astomatophorida
- Family: Opalinopsidae
- Genus: Chromidina
- Species: C. chattoni

Binomial name
- Chromidina chattoni Souidenne, Florent and Grellier, 2016

= Chromidina chattoni =

Species of single-celled organism

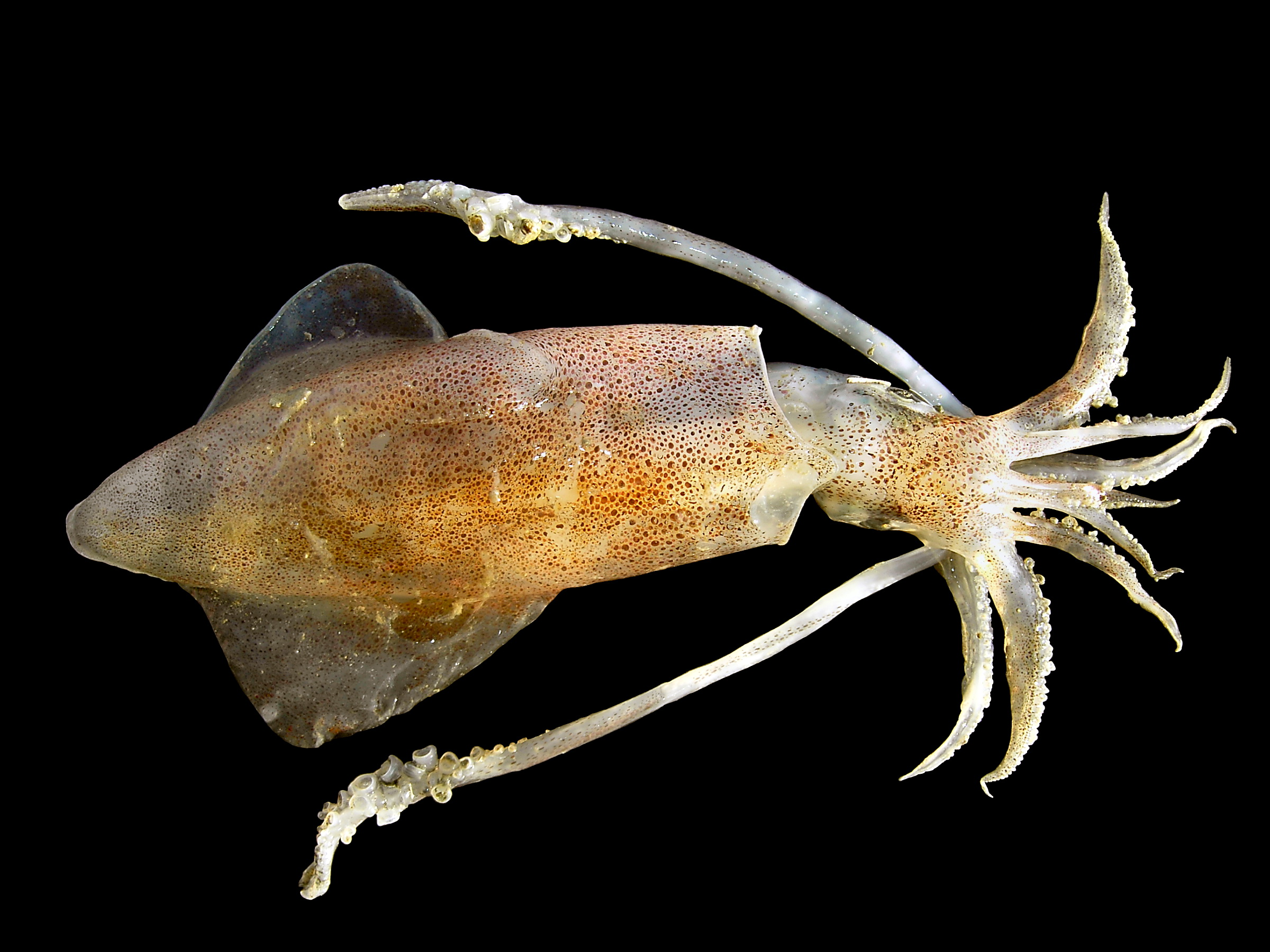
Loligo vulgaris, the host of Chromidina chattoni

Chromidina elegans is a species of ciliates, described in 2016. It is parasitic in the kidney appendages of the cuttlefish Loligo vulgaris. The type-locality is off Tunisia in the Mediterranean Sea.

The name of the species refers to French biologist Édouard Chatton, who worked on species of Chromidina.
