= Cyrtocaryidae =

Scientific classification
- Domain: Eukaryota
- Clade: Sar
- Clade: Alveolata
- Phylum: Ciliophora
- Class: Oligohymenophorea
- Order: Apostomatida
- Family: Cyrtocaryidae; Corliss, 1979

Family of single-celled organisms

Cyrtocaryidae is a family of ciliates of the order Apostomatida.
