= Rabbinical Court (Israel) =

Courts adjudicating personal status according to Jewish law

The Rabbinical courts are part of the Israeli legal system, which operates religious courts in parallel to the civil court system. The system, inherited from the previous British mandate system, grants religious courts jurisdiction over personal status matters such as marriage and divorce. Such courts exist for the recognized religious communities in Israel, including Muslim courts, Christian courts, and Jewish Rabbinical courts. These courts adjudicate personal status according to their respective religions, Jewish law in the case of Rabbinical courts.

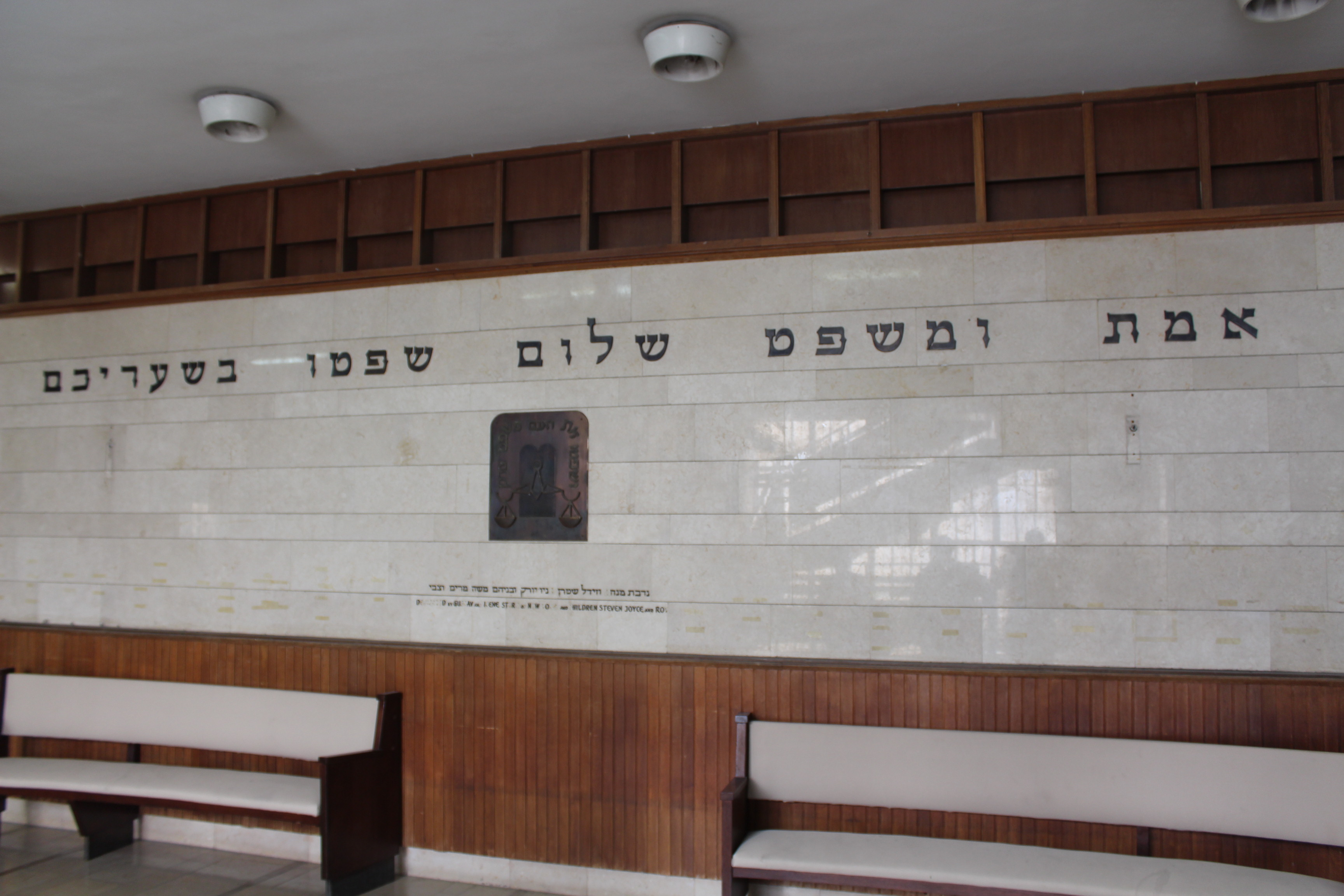
The lobby of the former Great Court in the Heichal Shlomo in Jerusalem

== Structure ==
The body responsible for the rabbinical courts is the administration of the rabbinical courts. At the head of the rabbinical court system is the Great Rabbinical Court of Appeals in Jerusalem, headed by one of the two chief rabbis of Israel. Since 2013, the Great Rabbinical Court of Appeals is headed by Rabbi David Lau, who also serves as President of the Great Rabbinical Court.

There are twelve local Rabbinical courts in Israel, in Jerusalem, Ariel, Ashdod, Haifa, Tel Aviv, Rehovot, Safed, Petah Tikva, Netanya, Tiberias, Ashqelon and Be'er Sheva.

== Jurisdiction ==
Civil marriage is not available under the laws of the State of Israel, and the Rabbinical courts are granted exclusive jurisdiction over the marriage of Jewish citizens. The non-religious aspects of divorce proceedings, such as child custody, child support, visitation rights and division of property can also proceed in civil courts.

The courts also have jurisdiction over matters of conversion to Judaism.

In February 2023 a bill was proposed in the Knesset to provide rabbinical courts with the same arbitration authority as civil arbitration, such that rabbinical courts could act as arbitrators in civil matters based on religious law if both parties so choose. According to the Bill, parties may elect to have their claims heard by the rabbinical courts instead of through the civil judiciary.

== Criticism ==
Critics say that the Rabbinical courts are biased against women and lack any women judges, so their authority should not be expanded. Critics state that there are cases in which a husband may require the wife to consent in advance to using rabbinical courts in the event of a future divorce, preventing the wife's ability to use the civil system.

== See also ==
- Beth din
- 2023 israeli judicial reforms
