= Édouard Chatton =

French biologist (1883–1947)

- Born: 11 October 1883; Romont, Switzerland
- Died: 23 April 1947 (aged 63); Banyuls-sur-Mer, France
- Known for: Distinction between prokaryotes and eukaryotes
- Scientific career
- Fields: Biology
- Author abbrev. (botany): Chatton

Édouard Chatton (French: [edwaʁ ʃatɔ̃]; 11 October 1883 – 23 April 1947) was a French biologist who first characterized the distinction between the prokaryotic and eukaryotic cellular types.

Chatton was born in Romont, Switzerland. His initial interest was in various human pathogenic protozoa, members of the Apicomplexa and Trypanosomatids. He later expanded his studies to include marine protists, helping to contribute to the description of the dinoflagellate protists. He coined the terms "eukaryote" and "prokaryote" in a 1925 paper, but did not elaborate on the concept; Roger Stanier and C. B. van Niel later adopted the nomenclature and popularized the classification of cellular organisms into prokaryotes and eukaryotes in a 1962 article. At the Pasteur Institute, Chatton met and became a mentor to André Michel Lwoff, future Nobel Laureate in Physiology or Medicine. The two scientists remained associates until Chatton's death in 1947, in Banyuls-sur-Mer, France.

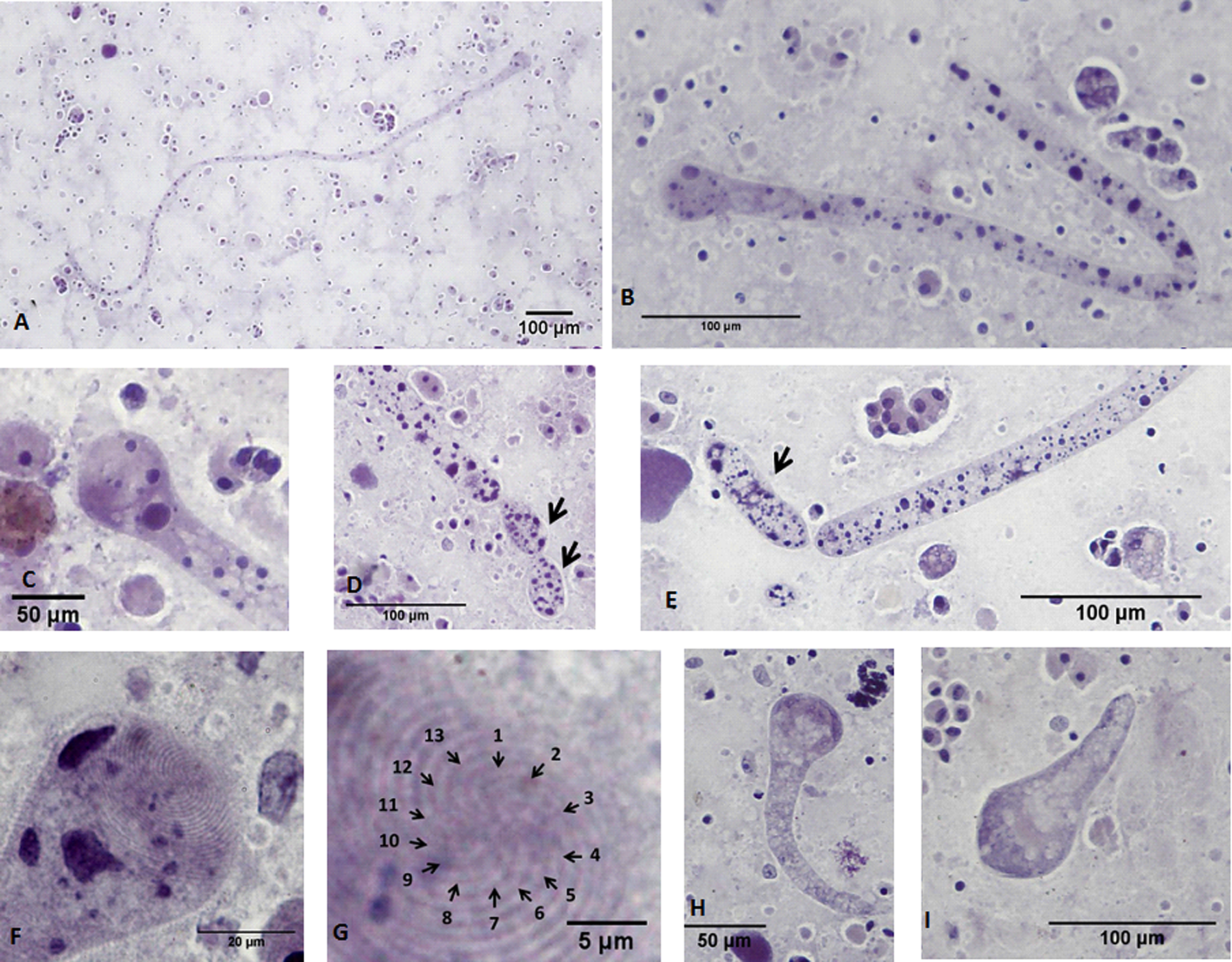
Chromidina chattoni, a species named in the honour of Édouard Chatton.
