= List of fellows of the Royal Society elected in 1958 =

Fellows of the Royal Society elected in 1958.

== Fellows ==
1. Michael Abercrombie
2. Sir Edward Penley Abraham
3. John Randal Baker
4. Arthur John Birch
5. Satyendra Nath Bose
6. Percy Wragg Brian
7. Edith Bulbring
8. Robert Kenneth Callow
9. Sir Frank Dixey
10. Paul Peter Ewald
11. Frank John Fenner
12. Sir William Henry Glanville
13. Albert Edward Green
14. Sir Alexander Haddow
15. Graham Higman
16. Arthur St George Joseph McCarthy Huggett
17. Hugh Christopher Longuet-Higgins
18. Basil Lythgoe
19. Sisir Kumar Mitra
20. Clifford Hiley Mortimer
21. Sir Ronald Sydney Nyholm
22. George Dixon Rochester
23. Sir Owen Alfred Saunders
24. Sir James Eric Smith
25. William Bertram Turrill

== Foreign members ==
1. Andre Michel Lwoff
2. Nikolai Nikolaevich Semenov
3. George Gaylord Simpson
4. Arthur Stoll
