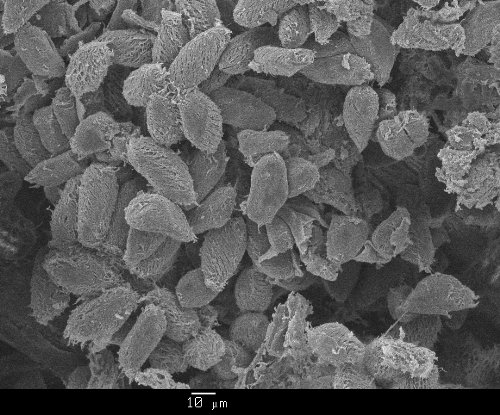
- SEM image of Pseudocollinia oregonensis

Scientific classification
- Domain: Eukaryota
- Supergroup: Alveolata
- Phylum: Ciliophora
- Class: Oligohymenophorea
- Order: Apostomatida
- Family: Pseudocolliniidae
- Genus: Pseudocollinia
- Species: P. oregonensis

Binomial name
- Pseudocollinia oregonensis (Gómez-Gutiérrez, Peterson & Morado, 2006)

Synonyms
- Collinia oregonensis Gómez-Gutiérrez, Petersen & Morado, 2006

= Pseudocollinia oregonensis =

Species of single-celled organism

Pseudocollinia oregonensis is a species of parasitoid ciliate of the family Pseudocolliniidae. It is known to infect the krill Euphausia pacifica, Thysanoessa spinifera, and Thysanoessa gregaria off the coast of Oregon and Washington. It caused a mass mortality of E. pacifica in June 2001 at the base of Astoria Canyon.
