= Pseudocollinia =

Scientific classification
- Domain: Eukaryota
- Supergroup: Alveolata
- Phylum: Ciliophora
- Class: Oligohymenophorea
- Order: Apostomatida
- Family: Pseudocolliniidae
- Genus: Pseudocollinia; Gómez-Gutiérrez, Strüder-Kypke, Lynn, Shaw, Aguilar-Méndez, López-Cortés, Martínez-Gómez & Robinson, 2012

Species
- Pseudocollinia beringensis; Pseudocollinia brintoni; Pseudocollinia oregonensis; Pseudocollinia similis

Genus of single-celled organisms

Pseudocollinia is a genus of parasitoid ciliates of the family Pseudocolliniidae.
