= Clifford H. Mortimer =

British zoologist and expert in hydrodynamics

Clifford Mortimer
- Born: Clifford Hiley Mortimer; 27 February 1911
- Died: 11 May 2010 (aged 99)
- Awards: FRS (1958)

Clifford Hiley Mortimer (27 February 1911 – 11 May 2010) was a 20th-century British zoologist and expert in hydrodynamics. He was the recipient of the 1995 A.C. Redfield Lifetime Achievement Award.

== Life ==
Mortimer was born in the village of Whitechurch in Somerset, the son of Walter Mortimer and his wife Bessie Russell. His parents had converted to Quakerism during the First World War and he was raised in this faith. His father worked in a printing shop but went blind around 1915, bringing an end to his career. His mother, a farmer's daughter, made ends meet by growing their own vegetables. Clifford and his brother Russell were educated at a Quaker school.

He studied Zoology at Manchester University graduating in 1932. He then went to Berlin for postgraduate research into clandocern genetics, gaining a PhD in 1935. He then took on a post at the Lake Windemere Laboratory of the Freshwater Biological Association, back in Britain.

During the Second World War he was attached to the Admiralty as a civilian scientist looking at wave behaviour, especially in reference to the English Channel. He was involved in the design of the floating breakwaters for the D-Day landings. After the war he made similar studies in relation to Lake Michigan in USA.

From 1956 he held the role of Director of the Scottish Marine Biological Station at Millport, Scotland. In 1970 Mortimer became President of the American Society of Limnology and Oceanography and three years later, President of the International Association for Great Lakes Research. In 1966 he became Distinguished Professor of Zoology at the University of Wisconsin-Milwaukee and founding Director of a newly formed Center for Great Lakes Studies.

He died on 11 May 2010 aged 99.

== Publications ==
Mortimer’s later publications include:

- Mortimer, Clifford H. (2004). Lake Michigan in Motion: Response of an Inland Sea to Weather, Earth-spin, and Human Activities. University of Wisconsin Press.
- Lemmin, U; Mortimer, C.H.; Bäuerle, E. (2005). "Internal Seiche Dynamics in Lake Geneva". Limnology and Oceanography. 50 (1): 207–216. Bibcode:2005LimOc..50..207L. doi:10.4319/lo.2005.50.1.0207. S2CID 86714215.
- Mortimer, C.H. (2006). "Inertial oscillations and related internal beat pulsations and surges in Lakes Michigan and Ontario". Limnology and Oceanography. 51 (5): 1941–1955. Bibcode:2006LimOc..51.1941M. doi:10.4319/lo.2006.51.5.1941. S2CID 18687754.

== Awards ==
Mortimer was elected a Fellow of the Royal Society (FRS) in 1958. In 1995 he received the A.C. Redfield Lifetime Achievement Award for his "lasting and substantive contributions across disciplines of aquatic biology, chemistry and physics, his leadership, and his general commitment to excellence." At this time, a special symposium was held in his honor.

== Family ==
In 1935 he married German citizen Ingeborg Closs (Professor Max Hartmann’s niece) and they had two daughters: Christine and Alison.
