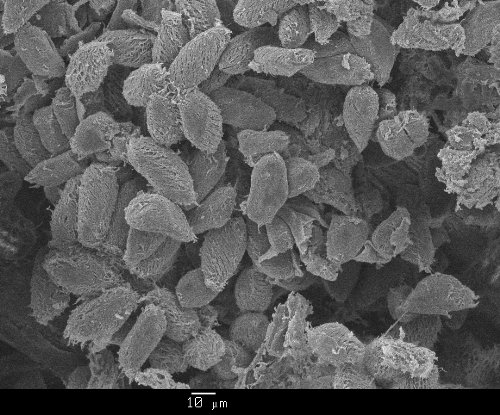
- SEM image of Collinia sp., which can cause mass mortality in affected krill populations

Scientific classification
- Domain: Eukaryota
- Supergroup: Alveolata
- Phylum: Ciliophora
- Class: Oligohymenophorea
- Order: Apostomatida
- Family: Colliniidae; Cépède, 1910

Genera
- Collinia Cépède, 1910; Lynnia Metz & Hechinger, 2021

= Colliniidae =

Family of single-celled organisms

Colliniidae is a family of ciliates of the order Apostomatida.
