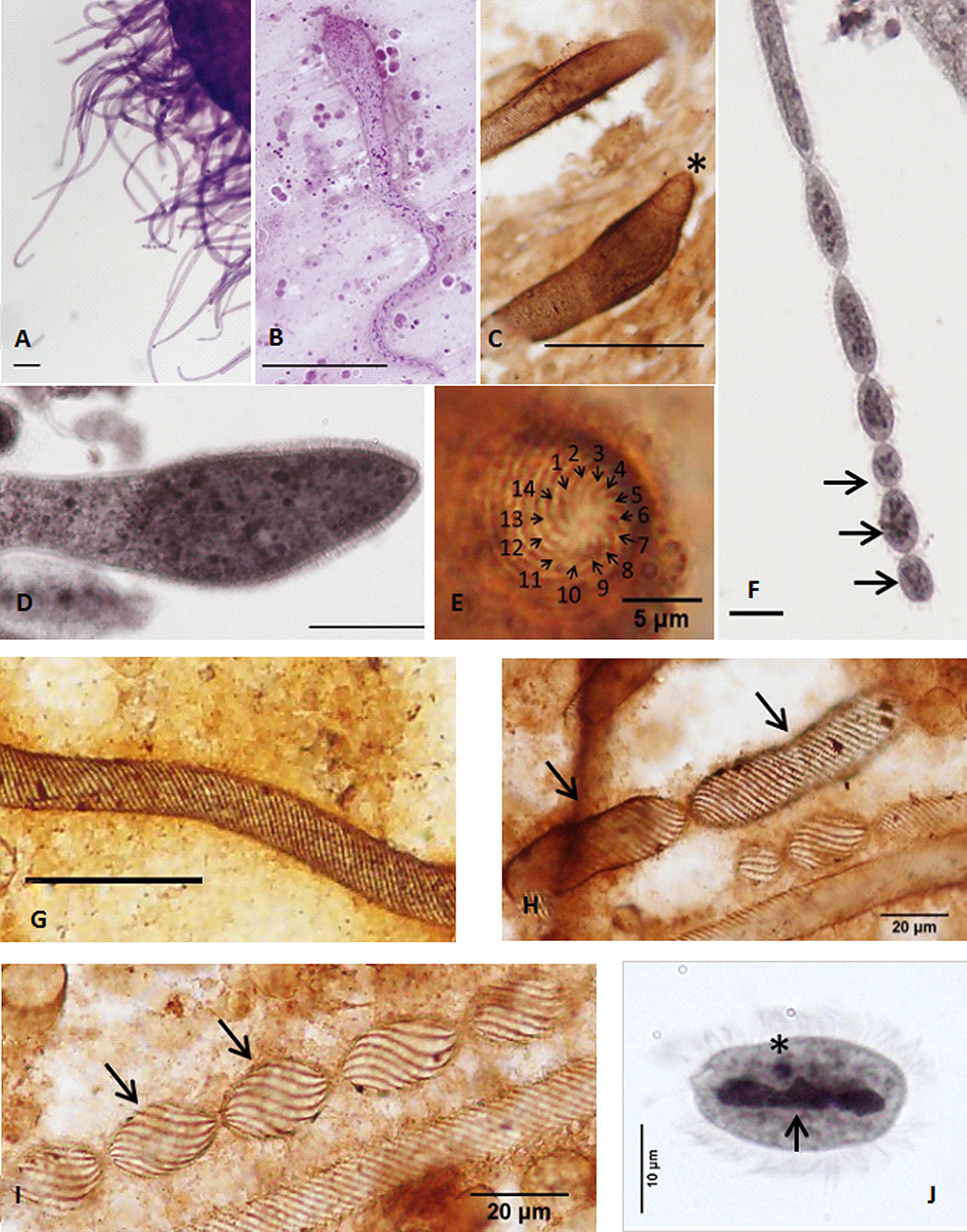
- Chromidina elegans, neohapantotype and paraneohapantotypes

Scientific classification
- Domain: Eukaryota
- Clade: Sar
- Clade: Alveolata
- Phylum: Ciliophora
- Class: Oligohymenophorea
- Order: Astomatophorida
- Family: Opalinopsidae
- Genus: Chromidina
- Species: C. elegans

Binomial name
- Chromidina elegans (Foettinger, 1881) Gonder, 1905

Synonyms
- Benedenia elegans Foettinger A., 1881

= Chromidina elegans =

Species of single-celled organism

Chromidina elegans is a species of parasitic ciliates. It is a parasite of the cuttlefish Sepia elegans.

== Taxonomy ==
Chromidina elegans was first described from specimen collected from off Naples, Italy, by Foettinger in 1881, bearing the name Benedenia elegans. It was reassigned to the Genus Chromidina by Gonder, in 1905.

The species was first redescribed by Chatton & Lwoff in 1935. and again redescribed in 2016 based on material in the collections of the Muséum National d'Histoire Naturelle in Paris. In the 2016 description, a neohapantotype and paraneohapantotypes were designated the species.
