= André Michel Lwoff =

French microbiologist (1902–1994)

André Michel Lwoff ForMemRS
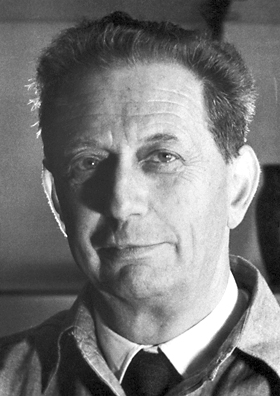
- André Lwoff
- Born: 8 May 1902; Ainay-le-Château, Allier, France
- Died: 30 September 1994 (aged 92); Paris, France
- Education: Pasteur Institute
- Known for: Provirus infection of bacteria
- Spouse: Marguerite Lwoff
- Awards: Nobel Prize in Medicine (1965); Leeuwenhoek Medal (1960)
- Scientific career
- Fields: Microbiology
- Workplaces: University of Cambridge; Max Planck Institute for Medical Research; Pasteur Institute

André Michel Lwoff (8 May 1902 – 30 September 1994) was a French microbiologist and Nobel laureate.

== Education, early life and career ==
Lwoff was born in Ainay-le-Château, Allier, in Auvergne, France, into a Jewish family of Russian-Polish origin, the son of Marie (Siminovitch), an artist, and Solomon Lwoff, a psychiatrist. He joined the Institute Pasteur in Paris when he was 19 years old. In 1932, he finished his PhD and, with the help of a grant from the Rockefeller Foundation, moved with his wife and co-researcher Marguerite Lwoff to the Kaiser Wilhelm Institute for Medical Research of Heidelberg to Otto Meyerhof, where he did research on the development of flagellates. Another Rockefeller grant allowed him go to the University of Cambridge in 1937. In 1938, he was appointed departmental head at the Institut Pasteur, where he did groundbreaking research on bacteriophages, microbiota and on the poliovirus.

== Awards and honors ==
He was awarded numerous prizes from the French Académie des Sciences, the Grand Prix Charles-Leopold Mayer, the Leeuwenhoek Medal of the Royal Netherlands Academy of Arts and Sciences in 1960 and the Keilin Medal of the British Biochemical Society in 1964. He was awarded a Nobel Prize in Medicine in 1965 for the discovery of the mechanism that some viruses (which he named proviruses) use to infect bacteria. He was an elected member of the United States National Academy of Sciences, the American Academy of Arts and Sciences, and the American Philosophical Society. Throughout his career he partnered with his wife Marguerite Lwoff although he gained considerably more recognition. Lwoff was elected a Foreign Member of the Royal Society in 1958. Lwoff was also president of the FEMS for a term of two years from 1974. The FEMS-Lwoff Award in microbiology is named in his honour.

== Personal life ==
Lwoff was married to the microbiologist and virologist Marguerite Lwoff with whom he published many works. He was also a humanist against capital punishment.

== Honours and awards ==
Grand-Croix of the Order of Legion of Honour

== See also ==
- List of Jewish Nobel laureates
