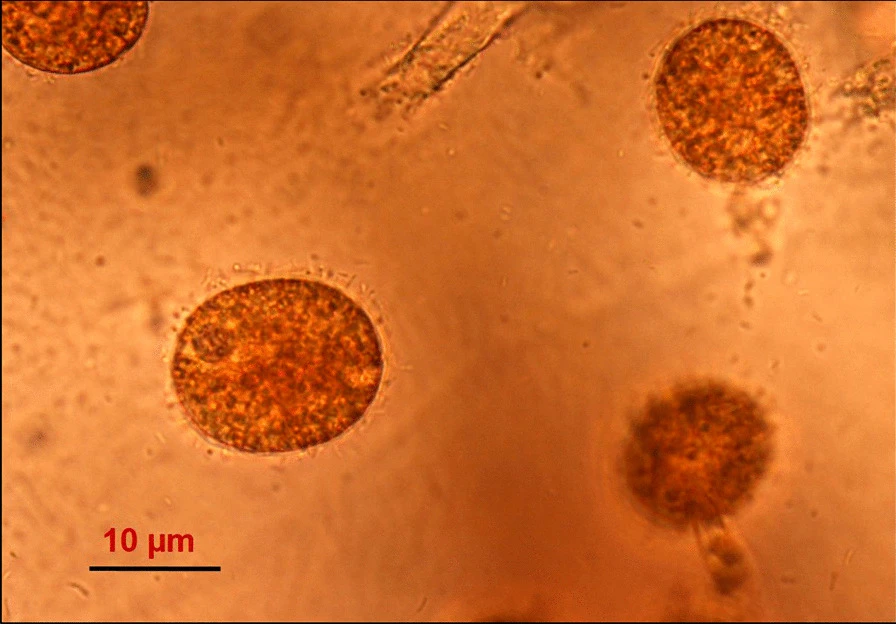
- Vampyrophrya pelagica

Scientific classification
- Domain: Eukaryota
- Clade: Sar
- Clade: Alveolata
- Phylum: Ciliophora
- Class: Oligohymenophorea
- Order: Apostomatida
- Family: Foettingeriidae; Chatton, 1911

Genera
- Foettingeria Caullery & Mesnil, 1903; Gymnodinioides Minkiewicz, 1912; Hyalophysa Bradbury 1966; Pericaryon Chatton, 1911; Spirophrya Chatton & Lwoff, 1924; Terebrospira; Vampyrophrya Chatton & Lwoff, 1931

= Foettingeriidae =

Family of single-celled organisms

The Foettingeriidae are a family of apostome ciliates of the order Apostomatida. Like other apostomes, they are symbiotic with Crustacea, and live in microbial cysts on their host's exoskeleton for most of their life. They excyst, or leave their cysts, when their hosts molt their exoskeleton in order to feed on the exuvial fluids trapped in their host's molted exoskeleton.

== Subfamilies ==
Genera of the family Foettingeriidae are separated into the exuviotrophs and the histotrophs.

=== Exuviotrophs ===
The exuviotrophs are a group of genera of the Foettingeriidae. They only feed on the exuvial fluids trapped in the host's cast-off exoskeleton.

=== Histotrophs ===
The histotrophs are another group of foettingeriid genera. Like the exuviotrophs, they feed on exuvial fluids of cast-off exoskeletons. They also excyst after their host dies naturally by injury and feed on the tissue fluids of the host's corpse.

== Life cycle ==
=== Encysted state ===
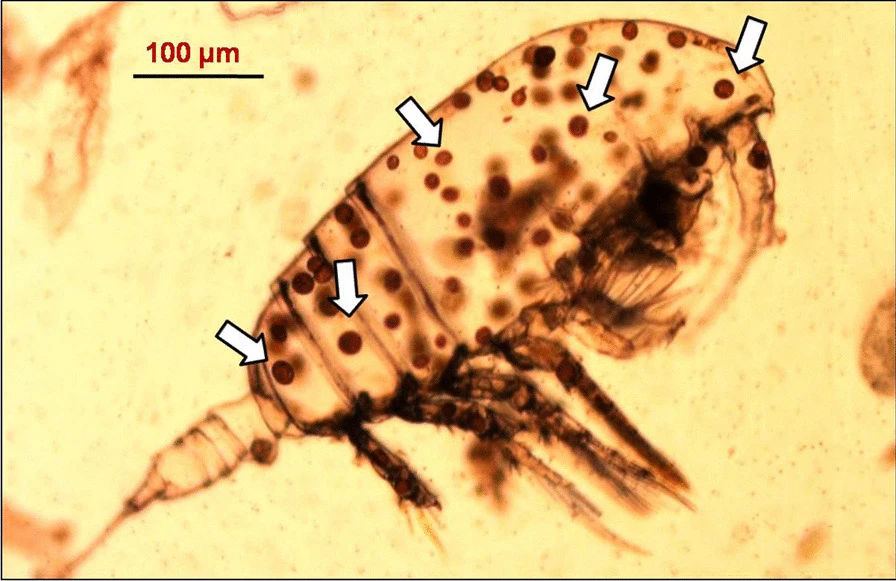
Vampyrophrya pelagica encysted in Bestiolina similis (arrows)

Protozoa of the family Foettingeriidae are called phoronts when they are encysted. While the phoront is encysted, it does not feed. Phoronts are encysted primarily on the gills of crustacea. Phoronts are more likely to be encysted on smaller crustacea than larger crustacea.

=== Metamorphosis ===
Phoronts go through metamorphosis to prepare for excystation. Metamorphosis changes the body shape, organization, and physiology of the phoront to allow for rapid ingestion and storage of large amounts of food. Histotrophic phoronts metamorphose within a few hours of encysting on their hosts. Exuviotrophic phoronts can remain dormant for months after encysting and only metamorphose immediately before their hosts molt their exoskeleton.

=== Engorged state ===
After the protozoa excysts and feeds, it becomes swollen to thirty times its initial volume. This engorged state is called the trophont.
