= Kenneth H. Mann =

British Canadian marine ecologist

Kenneth H. Mann (August 15, 1923 – January 24, 2010) received the first Lifetime Achievement Award of the American Society of Limnology and Oceanography in 1994.

== Personal data ==
Born Kenneth Henry Mann in Dovercourt, England to parents Henry and Mabel (Ashby) Mann, Mann had two siblings: Eric (who died at age 3) and Margaret Needle. He married Isabel (Ness) in 1946 in Scotland, 63 years before he died. He had three children: Ian, Sheila and Colin.

He studied in Dovercourt and, at age 11, he was awarded a scholarship to the local high school. Six years later, due to World War II, he was evacuated with his students to an inland village. Since he had always loved to cycle, he used that to travel to his parents and grandparents, often covering 100 miles to get there. He also loved gardening, nature and classical music.

Mann was a longstanding active member of the Gurdjieff Society of Atlantic Canada.

== Education ==
Mann started his teacher training course at St. Luke's College, Exeter, but again due to the war he was transferred in 1942 to Cheltenham to complete studies there. He completed a six-week summer school in electronics at Exeter University.

Mann had a B.Sc. (1949) and Ph.D. (1953) from the University of Reading and a D.Sc. from the University of London (1965).

== Professional positions ==
Mann was an officer in the Air Force. In 1967 he took his family and emigrated to Canada, working at the Bedford Institute of Oceanography (BIO). He also held the position of Professor and Chairman of Biology at Dalhousie University between 1972 and 1980. Between 1980 and 1987 he was Director of the Marine Ecology Laboratory at BIO.

== Acclaim ==
Throughout his life Mann mentored various post-doctoral students. According to one of them, Peter Wells, "he [Mann] was very kind to me as a young scientist working at the Marine Ecology Laboratory of Bedford Institute of Oceanography in the early 1980s, stopping to talk and showing interest in my research experiments on oil pollution. I helped him with marine management papers for one of his many books. His books are very well known and a real contribution to the field of marine ecology. What always impressed me about Ken was his huge ability to write such thoroughly researched syntheses of complex marine ecology topics, and his constant work ethic, being often in the Library at BIO for many years after official retirement. His dedication was an inspiration to those of us concerned about the health of marine ecosystems."

According to President John T. Lehman (who presented Mann his 1994 award at the 57th annual meeting of ASLO in Miami, FL), "as limnologists and oceanographers we owe Dr. Mann profound thanks for his prescient studies of freshwater and coastal marine ecosystems. Through more than 150 research publications and textbooks, he has enriched our knowledge of detrital food webs, decomposition processes, kelp bed ecology, fish production, coastal zone management, and energy flow in marine ecosystems."

One of the award nominators added: "Mann’s contribution to our field consist not only of his original contributions in ecosystem research, but in equal measure his lucid synthesis of knowledge across the entire field, not only bringing together various aspects of biological oceanography but physical oceanography and systems science as well."

== Publications ==
Mann published over 170 papers in scientific journals, along with contributing to the writing of various books.

== Awards ==
Mann received the Lifetime Achievement Award by the American Society of Limnology and Oceanography in 1994 "in recognition of his significant achievements in the aquatic sciences, his contributions to the stature of these fields, and his role as a model for those at earlier career stages."

He also received the Gulf of Maine Visionary Award by the Council on the Marine Environment in 2003 "for his commitment and leadership as an internationally recognized marine ecologist. This was given "in recognition of his scientific research in the ecology of temperate near-shore ecosystems; his role in resource and ecosystem protection; writing scientific publications and textbooks in marine ecology and coastal management; as a distinguished professor, and a scientist emeritus at Bedford Institute of Oceanography."

In 2008, Mann was the recipient of an honorary degree by Cape Breton University.
