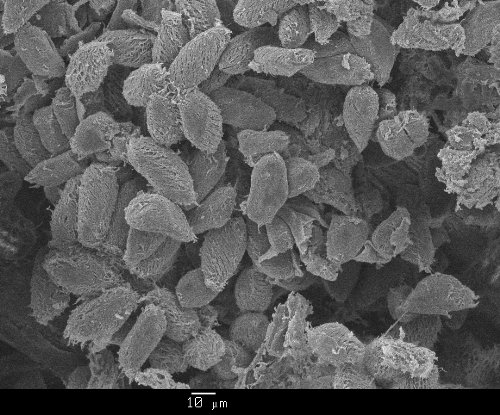
- SEM image of Collinia sp., which can cause mass mortality in affected krill populations

Scientific classification
- Domain: Eukaryota
- Clade: Diaphoretickes
- Clade: SAR
- Clade: Alveolata
- Phylum: Ciliophora
- Class: Oligohymenophorea
- Subclass: Apostomatia
- Order: Apostomatida; Chatton & Lwoff, 1928

Families
- Colliniidae Cépède, 1910; Cyrtocaryidae Corliss, 1979; Foettingeriidae Chatton, 1911; Pseudocolliniidae Chantangsi, Lynn, Rueckert, Prokopowicz, Panha & Leander, 2013

= Apostomatida =

Order of ciliates

The Apostomatida are an order of ciliates from the class Oligohymenophorea. Individual organisms from this order are called apostomes. They are symbiotic with Crustacea. For majority of their life cycle they are dormant and encysted on their host's exoskeleton. The life cycle of apostomes varies; most genera will multiply through the biological process of fission causing the larvae to develop within the crustacean host. Physical characteristics may include a small cytostome (mouth), often accompanied by a glandular rosette and sparse hair like projections (cilia) arranged in spiral rows on the organism.
