= Vorticella citrina =

Scientific classification
- Domain: Eukaryota
- Clade: Diaphoretickes
- Clade: SAR
- Clade: Alveolata
- Phylum: Ciliophora
- Class: Oligohymenophorea
- Order: Sessilida
- Family: Vorticellidae
- Genus: Vorticella
- Species: V. citrina

Binomial name
- Vorticella citrina Mull., 1786

Species of protozoan

Vorticella convallaria is a species of ciliates. It forms part of the V. convallaria species complex. V. citrina is lemon yellow to light green in colour.
