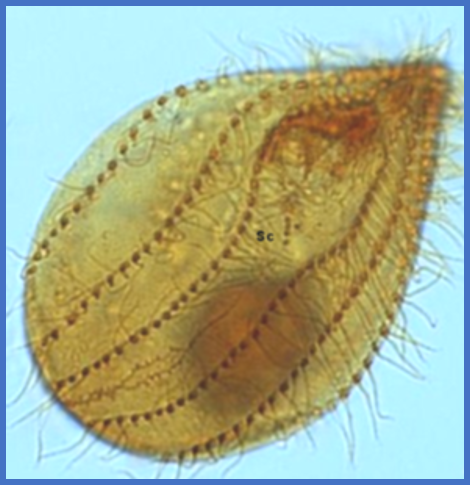
- Philasterides dicentrarchi, image provided by José Manuel Leiro, Jesús Lamas. University of Santiago de Compostela

Scientific classification
- Domain: Eukaryota
- Clade: Sar
- Clade: Alveolata
- Phylum: Ciliophora
- Class: Oligohymenophorea
- Order: Philasterida
- Family: Philasteridae
- Genus: Philasterides
- Species: P. dicentrarchi

Binomial name
- Philasterides dicentrarchi Dragesco et al., 1995

= Philasterides dicentrarchi =

Species of single-celled organism

Philasterides dicentrarchi is a marine protozoan ciliate that was first identified in 1995 after being isolated from infected European sea bass (Dicentrarchus labrax) reared in France. The species was also identified as the causative agent of outbreaks of scuticociliatosis that occurred between summer 1999 and spring 2000 in turbot (Scophthalmus maximus) cultivated in the Atlantic Ocean (Galicia, Northwest Spain). Infections caused by P. dicentrarchi have since been observed in turbot reared in both open flow and recirculating production systems. In addition, the ciliate has also been reported to cause infections in other flatfishes, such as the olive flounder (Paralichthys olivaceus) in Korea and the fine flounder (Paralichthys adspersus) in Peru, as well as in seadragons (Phyllopteryx taeniolatus and Phycodurus eques), seahorses (Hippocampus kuda and H. abdominalis), and several species of sharks in other parts of the world.

== Biology and pathology ==
Philasterides dicentrarchi is included within the subclass Scuticociliatia, which includes about 20 species of ciliates that are typically microphagous bacteriovores and generally abundant in eutrophic habitats in lakes and in coastal marine habitats. Some of these ciliates, characterized by possessing a scutica (a transient kinetosomal structure that is present during stomatogenesis), can behave as endoparasites and are capable of producing serious infections in a wide variety of vertebrates, especially fish, and invertebrates such as crustaceans and echinoderms. P. dicentrarchi is a microaerophilic scuticociliate that lives at the sea bottom, at or below the oxycline or on the monimolimnion, where it feeds on bacteria. However, when it encounters a host it can also behave as an opportunistic histiophagous parasite. Survival of the species inside the host and adaptation to a parasitic lifestyle are attributed to the existence of physiological adaptations at the level of mitochondrial metabolism. Such adaptations include the presence of a second terminal oxidase (which enables the ciliates to obtain energy and survive low levels of oxygen), antioxidant enzymes, inorganic pyrophosphatases (capable of producing energy by an ATP alternative pathway produced during oxidative metabolism) and the ability of the species to survive in hyposaline environments. Although the route of entry to the host is unknown, the findings of experimental infection studies suggest that the ciliate probably gains access through lesions in the gills and/or the skin. Infected fish show haemorrhagic ulcers on the skin (particularly around the operculum), abundant ascitic fluid in the abdominal cavity, uni- or bilateral exophthalmia, and systemic infection with the presence of ciliates in blood, gills, gastrointestinal tract, liver, spleen, kidneys and musculature. In the final phase of infection, ciliates reach the brain and cause softening and liquefaction of the tissue.

== Diagnosis ==
Diagnosis of P. dicentrarchi in the sea bass and the turbot was initially based primarily on morphological characteristics associated with the oral apparatus and the number of kineties. However, it has been suggested that the combined use of morphological, biological, molecular and serological techniques is necessary for correct identification of the species. P. dicentrarchi was previously considered a junior synonym of Miamiensis avidus. However, recent physiological and molecular studies have shown that P. dicentrarchi and M. avidus strain Ma/2 -ATCC 50180™- are different species.

== Treatments ==
No effective chemotherapeutic measures have been developed for controlling scuticociliatosis in the acute phase of the disease to date. However, the addition of disinfectants such as formalin, hydrogen peroxide and Jenoclean (a mixture of Atacama extract 97%-Zeolites- and citric acid 3%) to seawater has been demonstrated to kill the ciliates. Bath treatments consisting of a combination of benzalkonium chloride and bronopol have also proved to be effective in reducing fish mortality. Several compounds of well-known antiprotozoal activity, including niclosamide, oxyclozanide, bithionol sulfoxide, toltrazuril, N-(2 '-hydroxy-5 '-chloro-benzoyl) 2-chloro-4-nitroaniline, BP68, doxycycline hyclate, albendazole, carnidazole, pyrimethamine, hydrochloride quinacrine and quinine sulphate, are also active against P. dicentrarchi. Antimalarial drugs such as chloroquine and artemisinin also inhibit the in vitro growth of P. dicentrarchi. Other studies investigating the in vitro effects of several new synthetic compounds, including 2 naphthyridines, 2 pyridothienodiazines and 13 pyridothienotriazines, have demonstrated that all display parasiticide activity, and that pyridothienotriazine (12k) was the most active. In addition, several compounds of natural origin have also shown in vitro antiparasitic activity: the polyphenols mangiferin and (–)-epigallocatechin-3-gallate (EGCG), curcumin, resveratrol and the synthetic polyphenol propyl gallate.

== Prevention ==
Vaccines containing trophozoites inactivated with formalin and prepared in oil adjuvants have been developed and have shown good protection against the homologous serotype. Several P. dicentrarchi serotypes have been described. However, the protection induced against heterologous isolates appears to be very low or non-existent.

== Research ==
Research on Philasterides dicentrarchi, which includes aspects of cell biology, diagnostics, interactions with the host immune system, search for new treatments, development of vaccines or risk analysis, is being carried out under the EU funded Horizon2020 Project ParaFishControl.
