= List of species endemic to Mendocino County, California =

This is a list of plant and animal species, subspecies and varieties that are endemic to Mendocino County, California, or to Mendocino and no more than one neighboring county.

== Mendocino County only ==
=== Flora ===
- Chorizanthe howellii, a flowering plant in the buckwheat family found only near Fort Bragg
- Cuscuta pacifica var. papillata, a parasitic plant found only in the salt marshes of Mendocino county
- Eriogonum kelloggii, a species of buckwheat found only on Red Mountain near Leggett
- Harmonia guggolziorum, a flowering aster found in two locations near Hopland
- Limnanthes bakeri, a meadowfarm plant known in only 20 locations near Willits
- Pinus contorta var. bolanderi, the Mendocino shore pine tree, a variety of the more widespread lodgepole pine
- Sedum eastwoodiae, a flower in the stonecrop family found only on Red Mountain near Ukiah

=== Fauna ===
- Aplodontia rufa nigra (Point Arena mountain beaver), a mid-sized rodent regarded as a living fossil and found only near Point Arena
- Opercularia ampluscolonia, a protist that inhabits ponds in Mendocino County
- Plebejus idas lotis (Lotis blue butterfly), a possibly extinct gossamer-winged butterfly last recorded near Mendocino town in 1983
- Speyeria zerene behrensii (Behrens' silverspot butterfly), found only near Point Arena

== Mendocino County and one adjacent county ==
In addition, the following are endemic to an area contained in Mendocino and only one neighboring county:

=== Flora ===
- Arctostaphylos mendocinoensis, a species of manzanita found only in Mendocino and Sonoma counties
- Astragalus agnicidus, a species of milkvetch found only in Mendocino and Humboldt counties
- Cupressus pygmaea, a species of cypress tree found only in Mendocino and Sonoma counties
- Lewisia stebbinsii, a flowering purslane found only in Mendocino and Trinity counties
- Veratrum fimbriatum, the fringed corn lily, a relative of the lily found only in Mendocino and Sonoma counties

=== Fauna ===
- Helminthoglypta arrosa pomoensis, the Pomo Bronze Shoulderband, a 39 mm (1.5 in) land snail found in redwood forests in Mendocino County (in the Big River, Navarro River, and Russian Gulch watersheds) and Sonoma County

== See also ==
- Natural history of Mendocino County, California
