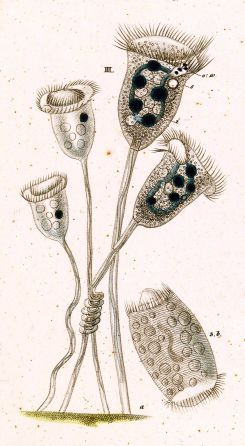

Scientific classification
- Domain: Eukaryota
- Clade: Diaphoretickes
- Clade: Sar
- Clade: Alveolata
- Phylum: Ciliophora
- Class: Oligohymenophorea
- Order: Sessilida
- Family: Vorticellidae
- Genus: Vorticella
- Species: V. convallaria

Binomial name
- Vorticella convallaria (Linnaeus, 1758)

= Vorticella convallaria =

Species of single-celled organism

Vorticella convallaria is a species of ciliates. It is the type species of the genus Vorticella. It resembles V. campanula, but differs in being somewhat narrow in the anterior end and usually having no refractile granules in the endoplasm.

Vorticella convallaria exhibits two morphological types. The primary type is the sessile trophont stalked zooid. When environmental conditions deteriorate the stalked zooid excises its stalk and transforms into Vorticella's secondary type, the motile dispersive telotroch. When the telotroch finds suitable environs it reattaches to the substrate and transforms back into a stalked zooid.

The cell body of this species is 50-95 μm long and 35-53 μm wide. The peristome ranges from 55-75 μm in diameter. The rod-like, contractile stalk - the "spasmoneme" - is 25-300 μm long and 4 μm wide. It can collapse into a tightly coiled helix in less than 1/60th of a second. The contraction occurs when the negatively charged "spasmin" proteins that make up the spasmoneme are neutralized by binding with calcium, causing the stalk to collapse.
