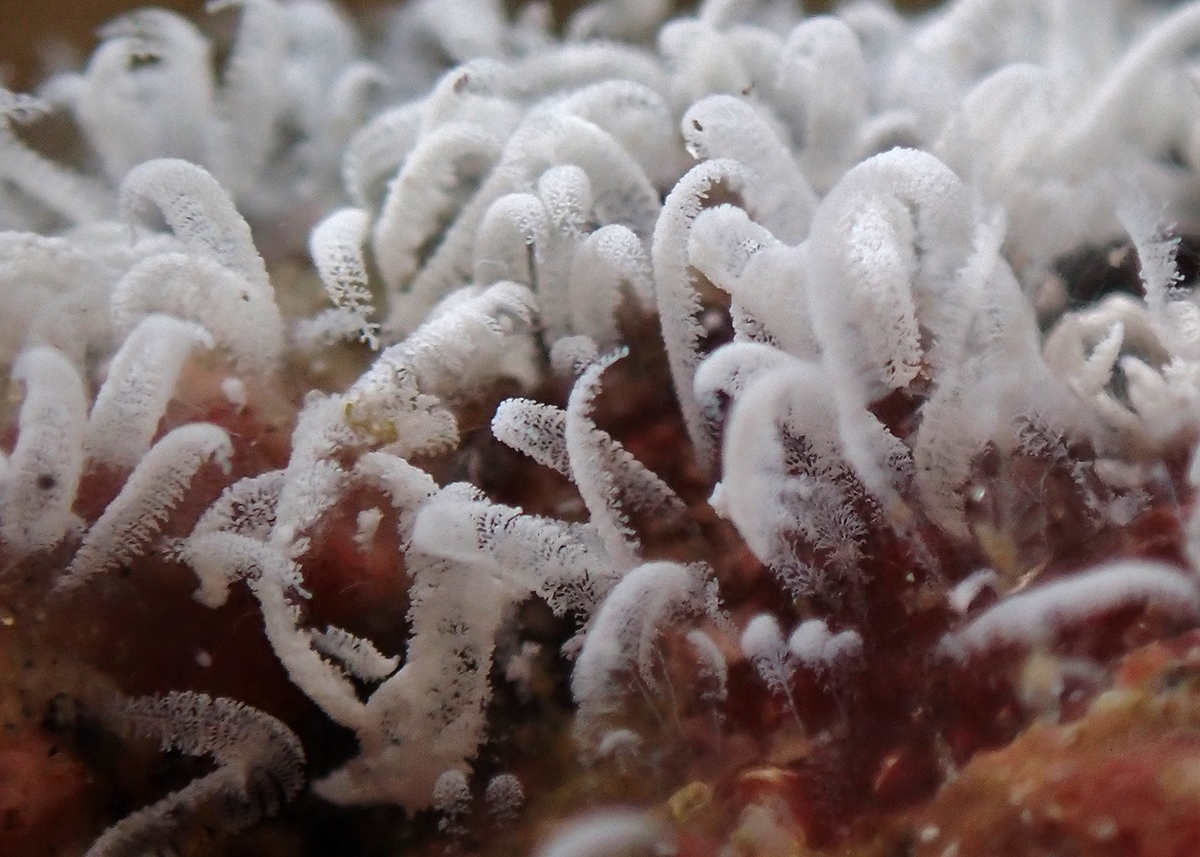
- Zoothamnium niveum

Scientific classification
- Domain: Eukaryota
- Clade: Sar
- Superphylum: Alveolata
- Phylum: Ciliophora
- Class: Oligohymenophorea
- Order: Sessilida
- Family: Zoothamniidae
- Genus: Zoothamnium; Bory de St. Vincent, 1824

= Zoothamnium =

Genus of single-celled organisms

Zoothamnium is a genus of ciliate protozoan.

== History ==
Zoothamnium was initially classified as a member of the family Vorticellidae by Ehrenberg in 1838. It was later reclassified to the family Zoothaminiidae, a new family defined by Sommer, in 1951. The unique ability of the central stalk to contract in a zig-zag pattern made the reclassification a necessity. Zoothamnium is a sessile peritrich, meaning it is a ciliated vase shaped protozoan that is nonmotile in nature. The genus comprises more than seventy species. Differentiation between species can often be difficult due to the strong similarities in form and function. The most commonly cited species are as follows:

- Zoothamnium alternans
- Zoothamnium arbuscula
- Zoothamnium arcuatum
- Zoothamnium bucciniiformum
- Zoothamnium duplicatum
- Zoothamnium florens
- Zoothamnium grossi
- Zoothamnium hentscheli
- Zoothamnium ignavum
- Zoothamnium intermedium
- Zoothamnium maximum
- Zoothamnium mucedo
- Zoothamnium nii
- Zoothamnium niveum
- Zoothamnium paraentzii
- Zoothamnium parahentscheli
- Zoothamnium parahiketes
- Zoothamnium pararbuscula
- Zoothamnium pelagicum
- Zoothamnium pluma
- Zoothamnium plumula
- Zoothamnium wangi
- Zoothamnium zhanjiangense

The species can be readily found in freshwater, brackish and/or marine waters between 5 °C and 25 °C, typically 0 – 8 meters deep. They thrive in areas of high suspended solids as they are detritus and anaerobic bacteria consumers. They can be primarily found in eutrophic waters and along the coastal regions bordering the North Atlantic Ocean. They typically form a symbiotic relationship with a wide variety of animals, although some may be free living attaching to aquatic plants and inanimate substrates. Any solid substrate can provide a base for growth. Copepods with chitin covering are the main animal group affected. The ciliate may attach to the gills and reduce ability to pass oxygen to body tissues. This may result in hypoxia due to mechanical blockage and failure to thrive. This attachment may cause black gill disease. or Surface Fouling Diseases. Zoothamnium has the potential to reduce reproductive abilities of the host with high prevalence. No histological damage occurs due to attachment, but if colonization becomes too great the host animal may die.

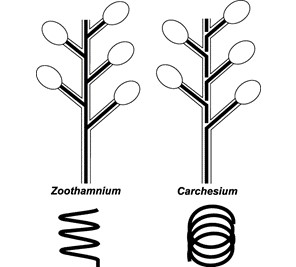

== Morphology ==
Ciliates that form branching colonies. The colonies can range in size from several zooids to hundreds of zooids depending on the species. Bodies take on a conical to almost spherical shape and are attached posterior with a stalk to the main stalk. The stalk allows for multiple ciliates to come into contact with a feed source once detected, or move away from a potential hazard as needed. The anterior end of the ciliates is covered in circular rows of cilia known as the somatic girdle. The main stalk that connects all of the ciliates branches is composed of a contractile spasmoneme, allowing stalk to contact as a single functioning unit. When contracting the colony can reduce its size by folding in as a single unit in a zig zag fashion. The protozoa can display polymorphism, or multiple physical forms of the same cell. Those on the stalks are shaped like rods, but those in the region of the ciliated oral apparatus of the zooids are shaped like small spheres.

Three different forms of the individual ciliate cells are present at the ends of the stalk, which are distinct in both morphology and function:

1. The large macrozooids, the adult developed cell, size varies considerably (20–150 μm) and can transform into swarmer cells and leave the colony. These cells are large and spherical and attached at several random locations throughout the branching colony.
2. The microzooids are small cells specialized for feeding, which the colony does by consumption of their symbiotic bacteria and other organic particles. These cells are smaller and oval shaped and are present on every branch of the stalk in multiples.
3. At the terminal ends of the colony are specialized zooids that can elongate and facilitate the asexual reproduction of the colony.

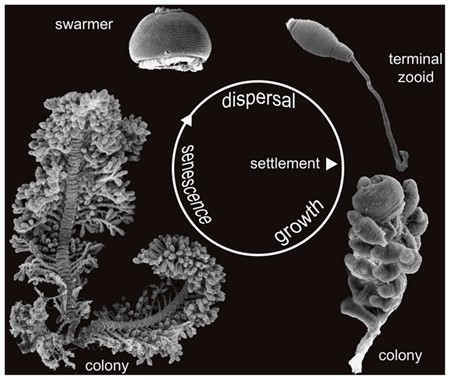

== Life cycle ==
Initial colonization is established by swarmer cells. Once a somatic girdle or circular rows of cilia are developed, a mature macrozooid can leave the mother colony as a swarmer. Once a suitable substrate is found, an initial segment of stalk is produced to attach the cell to the new colonization point.

Once settled, the colony begins to develop. All reproduction is accomplished by binary fusion. The terminal zooid cells will elongate and divide. The newly formed cell will attach to the same branch of the stalk as the terminal zooid and will mature into a microzooid.

The colony will continue to grow, adding additional branching as needed. As the colony develops and resources become depleted, stressed cells can form cilia on all surfaces, including a basal wreath of cilia, mature into macrozooids, and will detach from the stalk and swim away. Colonies may become large, as the macrozooids may not have to travel far to find additional substrate.

The initial colony will eventually enter into a senescent phase, where it will slow or even stop its biological functions of replication and release of swarmer cells. At this point microzooids will begin to die from the bottom of the stalk progressing to the top. A variety of bacteria will establish on the remaining stalk and decompose the materials.
