= Cothurnia elegans =

Scientific classification
- Domain: Eukaryota
- Clade: Sar
- Clade: Alveolata
- Phylum: Ciliophora
- Class: Oligohymenophorea
- Order: Sessilida
- Family: Vaginicolidae
- Genus: Cothurnia
- Species: C. elegans

Binomial name
- Cothurnia elegans Swarczewsky, 1930

Species of single-celled organism

Cothurnia elegans is a species of peritrichs in the family Vaginicolidae. It is found in Australia.
