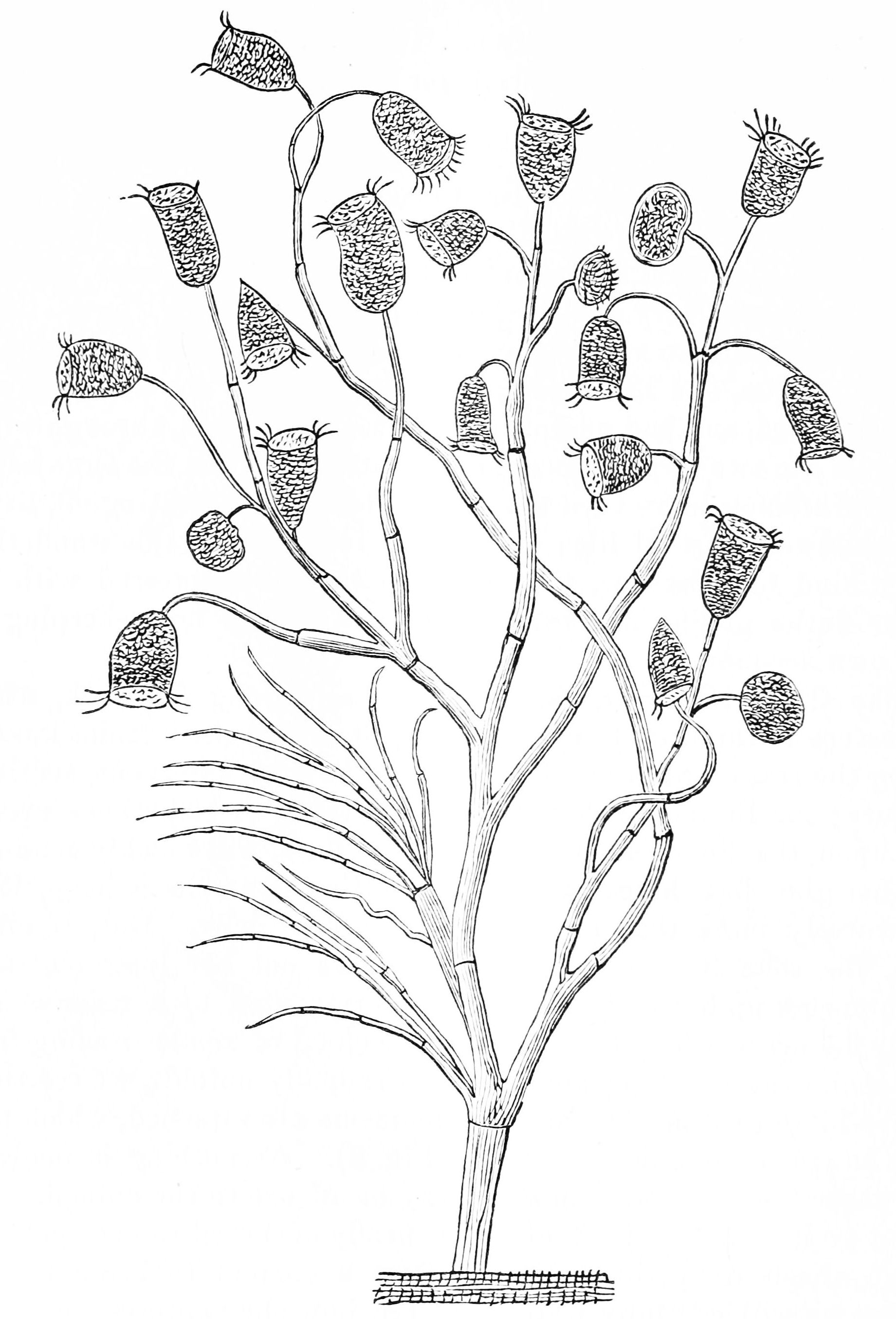
- Carchesium polypinum

Scientific classification
- Domain: Eukaryota
- Clade: Sar
- Superphylum: Alveolata
- Phylum: Ciliophora
- Class: Oligohymenophorea
- Order: Sessilida
- Family: Vorticellidae
- Genus: Carchesium; Ehrenberg, 1830

= Carchesium (ciliate) =

Genus of single-celled organisms

Carchesium is a genus of usually colonial peritrich ciliates in the Vorticellidae with a spirally contractile stalk. The inverted bell-shaped cells have an oral lip as in Epistylis.

The genus has a cosmopolitan distribution in freshwater and is a common part of the fauna of the aerobic stages of waste water treatment plants, such as activated sludge and trickling filters.
