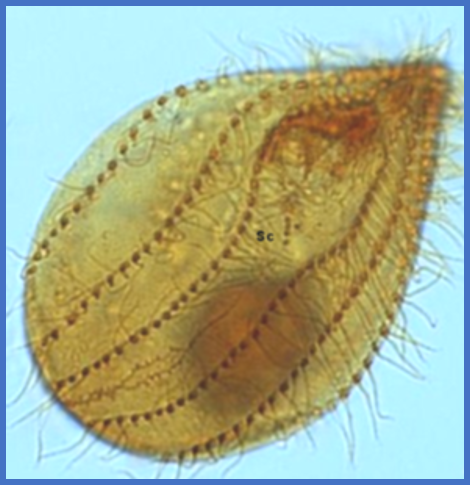
- Philasterides dicentrarchi

Scientific classification
- Domain: Eukaryota
- Clade: Sar
- Clade: Alveolata
- Phylum: Ciliophora
- Class: Oligohymenophorea
- Order: Philasterida
- Family: Philasteridae
- Genus: Philasterides; Kahl, 1931

Species
- Philasterides armata (Kahl, 1926) Kahl, 1931; Philasterides armatalis Song, 2000; Philasterides dicentrarchi Dragesco et al., 1995

= Philasterides =

Genus of single-celled organisms

Philasterides is a genus of ciliates in the order Philasteridae.

The species P. dicentrarchi was previously considered a junior synonym of Miamiensis avidus. However, recent physiological and molecular studies have shown that P. dicentrarchi and M. avidus are different species.
