= Uronema elegans =

Scientific classification
- Domain: Eukaryota
- Clade: Sar
- Clade: Alveolata
- Phylum: Ciliophora
- Class: Oligohymenophorea
- Order: Philasterida
- Family: Uronematidae
- Genus: Uronema
- Species: U. elegans

Binomial name
- Uronema elegans (Maupas, 1883)

Synonyms
- Cryptochilum elegans Maupas, 1883

Species of single-celled organism

Uronema elegans is a species of ciliates in the family Uronematidae. It is found in Norway.
