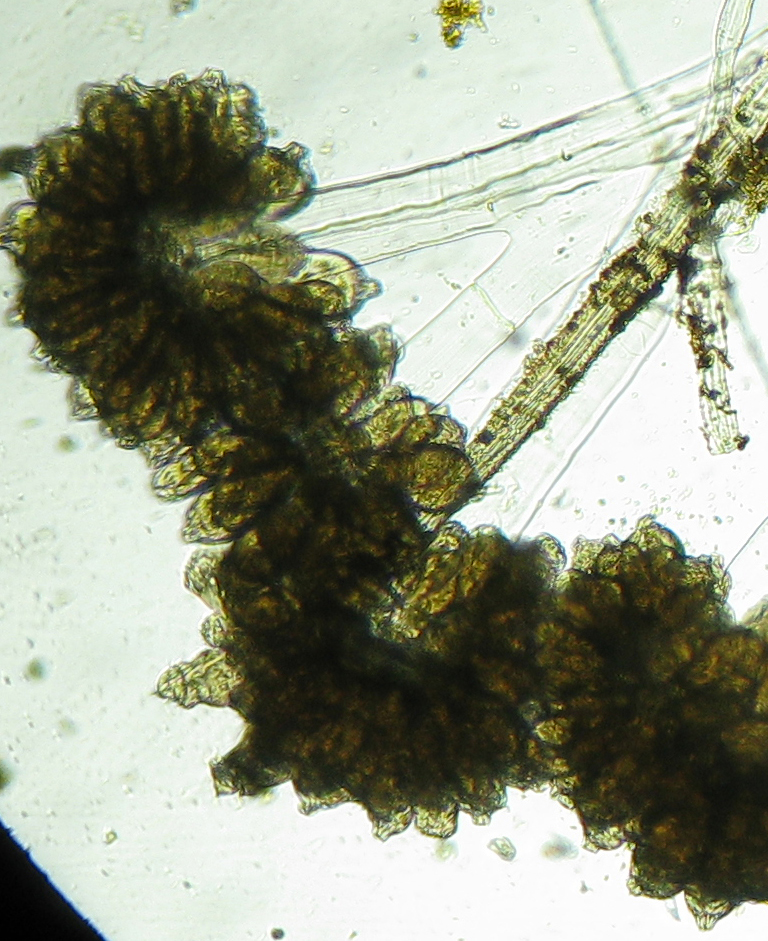

Scientific classification
- Domain: Eukaryota
- Clade: Sar
- Clade: Alveolata
- Phylum: Ciliophora
- Class: Oligohymenophorea
- Order: Sessilida
- Family: Operculariidae
- Genus: Opercularia
- Species: O. ampluscolonia

Binomial name
- Opercularia ampluscolonia

= Opercularia ampluscolonia =

Species of plant

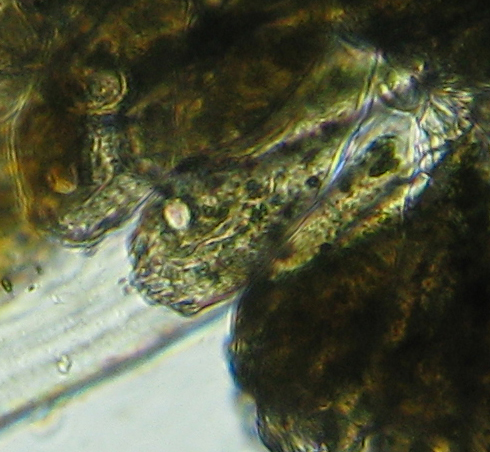
Opercularia ampluscolonia

Opercularia ampluscolonia is a species of fresh water, colonial, sessiline peritrich ciliate. This species produces a branched stalk that is often delicately striate in a longitudinal direction. There can be more than ninety-seven zooids per branched stalk. Zooids reproduce asexually and form dense clusters at the ends of each branch. This filter-feeding protist inhabits ponds in Mendocino County, California.
