= Myxophyllum steenstrupi =

Scientific classification
- Domain: Eukaryota
- Clade: Diaphoretickes
- Clade: Sar
- Clade: Alveolata
- Phylum: Ciliophora
- Class: Oligohymenophorea
- Order: Philasterida
- Family: Thigmophryidae
- Genus: Myxophyllum
- Species: M. steenstrupi

Binomial name
- Myxophyllum steenstrupi (Stein, 1861) Raabe, 1934

Species of ciliate

Myxophyllum steenstrupi is a symbiotic ciliate living in the body slime and mantle cavity of terrestrial pulmonates which was rediscovered after almost 30 years.
