= Miamiensis avidus =

Scientific classification
- Domain: Eukaryota
- Supergroup: Alveolata
- Phylum: Ciliophora
- Class: Oligohymenophorea
- Order: Philasterida
- Family: Parauronematidae
- Genus: Miamiensis
- Species: M. avidus

Binomial name
- Miamiensis avidus Thompson & Moewus, 1964

Species of single-celled organism

Miamiensis avidus is a species of unicellular marine eukaryote that is a parasite of many different types of fish. It is one of several organisms known to cause the fish disease scuticociliatosis and is considered an economically significant pathogen of farmed fish. M. avidus is believed to be the cause of a 2017 die-off of fish and sharks in the San Francisco Bay.

== Taxonomy ==
Miamiensis avidus is a scuticociliate first described in 1964. It was discovered during a study originally aimed at investigating viruses of marine mammals, and was isolated from the bodies of seahorses collected from waters near Miami, Florida. The name of the genus refers to the University of Miami, where the first studies of the ciliate were performed, and the specific name avidus refers to its "greedy feeding habits".

The name Philasterides dicentrarchi was originally applied to a similar ciliate identified as an infectious parasite in Mediterranean sea bass, but is now recognized as a junior synonym of M. avidus. However, a recent study suggests they may in fact be distinct species. The molecular phylogeny of scuticociliates is an active area of research.

== Morphology ==
Miamiensis avidus cells are oval-shaped with a relatively pointed anterior end and a contractile vacuole toward the rounded posterior end of the cell. The cells feature several kineties, or rows of cilia along the major axis of the cell body, and a single caudal cilium. Descriptions vary on the number of kineties per cell, from as few as 10 to as many as 14. Each cell possesses one macronucleus and one micronucleus. The original 1964 description emphasized the significance of the morphology of the buccal apparatus and specialized oral cilia in differentiating among related ciliates. Descriptions of these features differ subtly among one another and may differentiate M. avidus from closely related species. The life cycle of M. avidus has been described and includes at least 3 stages: 1) Microstome, which mainly feeds on bacteria; 2) Macrostome, a voracious stage with a larger oral cavity which feeds on host tissues or other protozoans; and 3) tomite, a non-feeding, starvation-induced, smaller, dispersal stage. The intricate sequence in the morphological microstome to macrostome transformation of M. avidus has been described.

== Ecological significance ==
Scuticociliates are free-living marine microorganisms that can function as opportunistic or facultative parasites. M. avidus infects a broad range of teleost species, as well as other groups of marine organisms such as seahorses, sharks, and crustaceans. It is one of the best characterized of the group of scuticoliciates known to cause the fish disease scuticociliatosis, in which histophagous (tissue-eating) ciliates consume the blood, skin, and eventually internal organs of infected fish. The disease has an especially high mortality rate among flatfish, possibly due to their sedentary lifestyle involving high levels of skin contact between individuals. In one comparative study, M. avidus infections spread further within host fish and had a significantly higher mortality rate than did similar scuticociliates. Infections caused by M. avidus have been described in wild fish populations and in aquaculture, where it is an economically significant pathogen. The species is believed to be responsible for a widely reported 2017 scuticociliatosis outbreak on the coast of Northern California, which saw thousands of dead fish and leopard sharks found in the San Francisco Bay.

It is unclear what triggers free-living M. avidus to initiate infection. Experimental infections under laboratory conditions have produced varying results on the mechanism of infection; results in different conditions and with different host species vary in whether free-living ciliates can infect healthy fish or require an abraded or damaged skin surface. Protease enzymes are commonly expressed by infectious parasites that damage host tissue, and are believed to play a role in M. avidus infections. Transformation in M. avidus has been shown to be induced by a prey derived soluble factor, although its exact identity is unknown.
