= Dipartiella =

Scientific classification
- Domain: Eukaryota
- Clade: Sar
- Clade: Alveolata
- Phylum: Ciliophora
- Class: Oligohymenophorea
- Order: Mobilida
- Family: Trichodinidae
- Genus: Dipartiella; Stein, 1961

Genus of single-celled organisms

Dipartiella is a genus of marine eukaryotes from the family Trichodinidae. The species Dipartiella simplex can be found in edible fish.
