= Vorticella campanula =

Scientific classification
- Domain: Eukaryota
- Clade: Diaphoretickes
- Clade: SAR
- Clade: Alveolata
- Phylum: Ciliophora
- Class: Oligohymenophorea
- Order: Sessilida
- Family: Vorticellidae
- Genus: Vorticella
- Species: V. campanula

Binomial name
- Vorticella campanula Ehr., 1831

Species of single-celled organism

The protozoon Vorticella campanula is found in freshwater ponds, lakes, rivers, and streams with aquatic vegetation. It has a global distribution. Vorticella campanula is solitary and not colonial but usually social, several of them being found together. Vorticella campanula is a sedentary (fixed) form. It is commonly attached by a long highly contractile stalk to some submerged objects like weeds, animals, or stones. Vorticella campanula is often found in large groups. All the individuals in the group, however, remain free and independent of each other. Most Vorticella are found in abundance in stagnant water rich in decaying organic matter and feed largely on bacteria, but Vorticella campanula live only in uncontaminated water where bacterial growth is poor.
