= Epistylis =

Scientific classification
- Domain: Eukaryota
- Clade: Sar
- Superphylum: Alveolata
- Phylum: Ciliophora
- Class: Oligohymenophorea
- Order: Sessilida
- Family: Epistylididae
- Genus: Epistylis; Ehrenberg, 1830

Genus of single-celled organisms

Epistylis is a genus of usually colonial peritrich ciliates with a short oral disc and collar, and a rigid stalk. The rigid stalk differentiates Epistylis from the very similar genus Carchesium in which the stalks are contractile like those in Vorticella.
