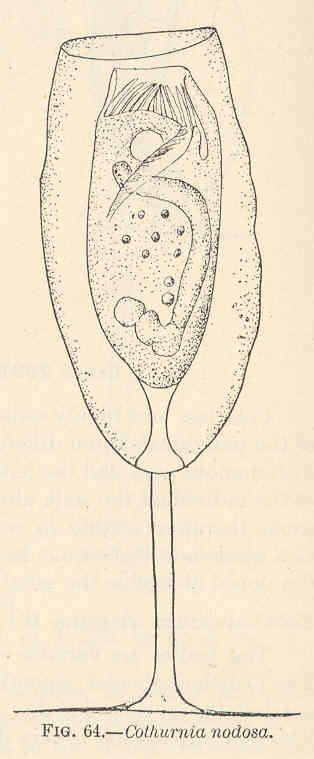
- Cothurnia nodosa

Scientific classification
- Domain: Eukaryota
- Clade: Diaphoretickes
- Clade: Sar
- Clade: Alveolata
- Phylum: Ciliophora
- Class: Oligohymenophorea
- Order: Sessilida
- Family: Vaginicolidae
- Genus: Cothurnia; Ehrenberg, 1831

Species
- Several, including: Cothurnia elegans; Cothurnia salina; Cothurnia butschlii; Cothurnia calix; Cothurnia apseudophila; Cothurnia cohnii; Cothurnia furcifer; Cothurnia lobata; Cothurnia kahli; Cothurnia curva; Cothurnia obligua; Cothurnia rhabdota; Cothurnia triangula; Cothurnia vorticelloides; Cothurnia vulgaris

= Cothurnia =

Genus of protozoans belonging to peritrich ciliates

Cothurnia is a genus of freshwater and marine peritrichs in the family Vaginicolidae. It is characterised by living in a transparent tubular lorica. During the feeding or vegetative phase of its life cycle, Cothurnia attaches to submerged surfaces through a short stalk — mostly on the surfaces of fishes, crustaceans and aquatic plants. It is commonly studied for its epibiotic relationship with the host that it is attached to.

The etymology of the genus name Cothurnia derives from the ancient greek word κόθορνος (kóthornos), and from the Latin word cothurnus, meaning "buskin, or high boot".

Cothurnia has been noted for its correlation with water quality (especially in water treatment plants). It has been observed a decrease in the prevalence of Cothurnia on prawns as the water quality deteriorates, making it a good indicator of the quality of water in the environment.

Cothurnia is often confused with Vaginicola due to their similar morphologies.

== Historical background ==
Cothurnia and other peritrichs were among the first microbes observed by Antoine van Leeuwenhoek upon the invention of his microscope in the 17th century. His observation of Cothurnia, Coleps and Vorticella under the microscope led to the publication of their illustrations in 1702. The name Cothurnia was coined two centuries later by Christian Gottfried Ehrenberg to distinguish loricate peritrichs with stalks (Cothurnia) from those without stalks (Vaginicola). Further studies of the genus led to the establishment of Cothurnia imberbis as the type species in 1831. Ehrenberg illustrated C.imberbis Ehrenberg in his 1838 book called Die Infusionsthierchen als Vollkommene Organismen. However, Jankowski noted that C.imberbis was not desirable to be a type species because it was understudied and difficult to do so; apparently unaware of Bacon's extensive study of it. In Ehrenberg's 1839 publication with Louis Mandl entitled Traité pratique du microscope et de son emploi dans l'étude des corps organisés, they provided the definite description of Cothurnia.

Since then, the taxonomy of Cothurnia remained largely unchanged for fifty years, with about 167 species described.

== Description ==
Cothurnia is mostly sessile, particularly when feeding or asexual reproduction. However, it can be motile when its habitat is disturbed or to search for a habitat with a higher abundance of food. Its mobile stage is called a telotroch and is often mouthless.

The cilia of the organism are located on the peristomal disc of the zooid. When feeding, the zooid slowly extends out of its lorica and rhythmically beats its oral cilia to generate a vortex to draw its prey towards its peristomal lip.

A typical species of Cothurnia forms a cylindrical lorica to protect the trumpet-shaped zooid. The lorica may be compressed or elongated along the longitudinal axis, resulting in oblate or prolate forms respectively, or it may be compressed along the transverse axis, resulting in dorso-ventrally compressed forms. The shape of these loricae have traditionally been used to distinguish between species, but since they can vary drastically in size and shape, there has been debates regarding the usefulness of the lorica shape as a taxonomic character. When disturbed, the zooid rapidly retracts into the lorica. There is no specific mechanism of aperture closing of the lorica.

Towards the posterior end of the lorica, there is a short and slender endostyle that attaches the zooid to the septum of the lorica and a mesostyle that connects the endostyle to the base of the lorica. The scopula produces a short, non-contractile stalk that protrudes through an aperture at the aboral end of its lorica to affix the organism to surfaces. Some species possess smooth and featureless stalks, while others have transverse folds on the surface of their stalks. The stalk forms a basal disc to attach itself like a suction cup.

== Reproduction ==
Reproduction in Cothurnia begins with the macronucleus taking a transverse position in the zooid. With the help of two contractile vacuoles and vestibular membranes, fission starts at the distal end and the zooid divides in the mid-longitudinal (apical/basal) plane. The daughter organism develops membranelles near its basal end and swims out of the parent lorica. It then looks for a substratum to settle upon. Once it finds a place, it loses its peripheral ring of membranelles and becomes spherical. The stalk begins to develop at the same time. A thin wall then forms around the organism, which develops into the lorica of the daughter organism.

== Habitat and ecology ==
Cothurnia has a cosmopolitan distribution. It lives mainly in marine ecosystems, but it is also reported that there may be up to eight freshwater species in the genus. They live close to the surface of the ocean - up to 0.75m in depth.

Cothurnia is a suspension feeder. It spends most of its life stage as an epibiont on crustaceans, fishes, polychaetes, underwater plants and surfaces. The relationship is usually commensal in nature, as no damage is observed on the surface of the host (even when the epibiont is present in large numbers). In 2014, Álvarez-Campos et al. discovered the first epibiotic relationship between Cothurnia and a syllid polychaete that has not previously been observed before. This discovery leads them to suggest that Cothurnia maintained the epibiotic relationship on the motile substratum as an advantageous adaptation towards increasing food availability - as Cothurnia spends most of its life stage as a sessile organism.

In some crustaceans however, the epibiotic relationship can be detrimental to the host, because of competition for food or negative effects on locomotion or sensory functions. This makes the host more susceptible to predation and as a consequence, it becomes less competitive as compared to crustaceans that lack the epibiont.
