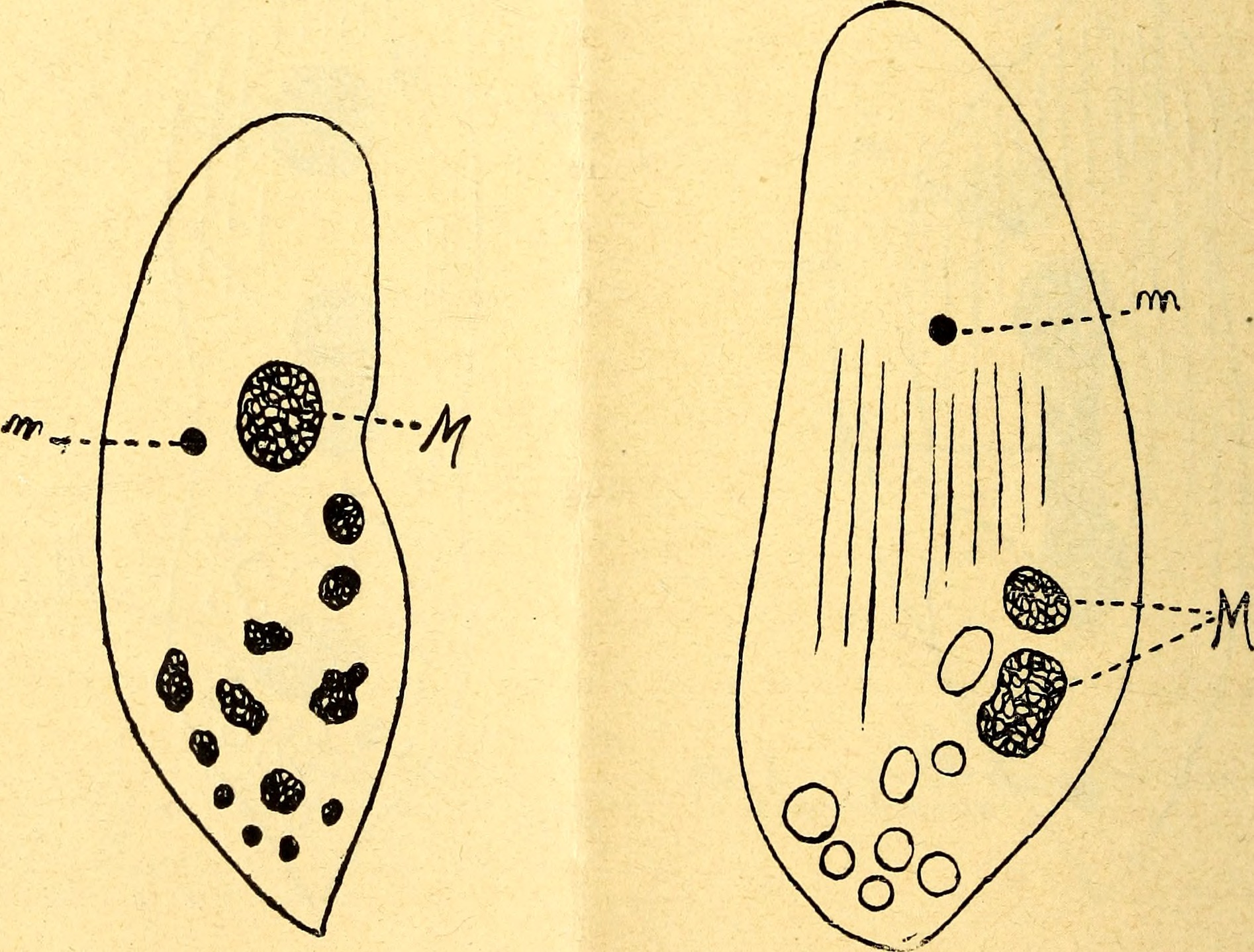
- Cryptochilum - Illustration in Bullettino delle sedute della Accademia gioenia di scienze naturali in Catania, 1893

Scientific classification
- Domain: Eukaryota
- Clade: Sar
- Clade: Alveolata
- Phylum: Ciliophora
- Class: Oligohymenophorea
- Order: Philasterida
- Family: Cryptochilidae
- Genus: Cryptochilum; Maupas, 1883

Species
- Cryptochilum boreale Hentschel, 1924; Cryptochilum echini Cuenot, 1912; Cryptochilum reniforme Petz, Song & Wilbert, 1995

= Cryptochilum =

Genus of single-celled organisms

Cryptochilum is a genus of marine Oligohymenophorean ciliates that belongs to the family Cryptochilidae.

Cryptochilum boreale has been recovered from the intestine of the Common Sea Urchin (Echinus esculentus).

== Taxonomy ==
=== Species ===
1. Cryptochilum boreale Hentschel, 1924
2. Cryptochilum echini Cuenot, 1912
3. Cryptochilum reniforme Petz, Song & Wilbert, 1995

Names brought to synonymy

- Cryptochilum elegans Maupas, 1883, a synonym for Uronema elegans (Maupas, 1883) Hamburger & Buddenbrock, 1911
