= Myxophyllum =

Scientific classification
- Domain: Eukaryota
- Clade: Sar
- Clade: Alveolata
- Phylum: Ciliophora
- Class: Oligohymenophorea
- Order: Philasterida
- Family: Thigmophryidae
- Genus: Myxophyllum; Xu & Song, 2000

Genus of protozoans

Myxophyllum is a genus of ciliates belonging to the family Thigmophryidae. As of 2021, its status in zoological nomenclature is uncertain.

== Species ==
- Myxophyllum magnum Xu & Song, 2000
- Myxophyllum steenstrupi (Stein, 1861) Raabe, 1934
