= Opercularia (ciliate) =

Scientific classification
- Domain: Eukaryota
- Clade: Sar
- Clade: Alveolata
- Phylum: Ciliophora
- Class: Oligohymenophorea
- Order: Sessilida
- Family: Operculariidae
- Genus: Opercularia; Goldfuss, 1820

Species of ciliate

Opercularia is a genus of freshwater, colonial, sessiline peritrich ciliates. As consumers of free bacteria in the water, several species of Opercularia serve as important indicator organisms in the study of wastewater treatment. Operculariids can be distinguished from other sessile peritrichs (many of which share very similar body plans) by their prominent, non-contractile stalk; peristome without lip; and elongate, horseshoe-shaped macronucleus.

== Etymology ==
The name Opercularia comes from the Latin opercularis, which means covered (with a lid). This is in reference to their lid-like peristomal disk.

== Selected species ==
Selected species include:

- Opercularia allensi Stockes, 1887
- Opercularia coarctata Claparede & Lachmann, 1858
- Opercularia cylindrata Wrzesniowski, 1870
- Opercularia longigula Nenninger, 1948
- Opercularia minima Kahl, 1935
- Opercularia nutans (Ehrenberg, 1831) Stein, 1854
- Opercularia stenostoma Stein-D'Udekem
