= Opercularia =

Opercularia may refer to:

- Opercularia (ciliate), a genus of sessiline peritrich ciliates
- Opercularia (plant), a genus of plants in the family Rubiaceae
