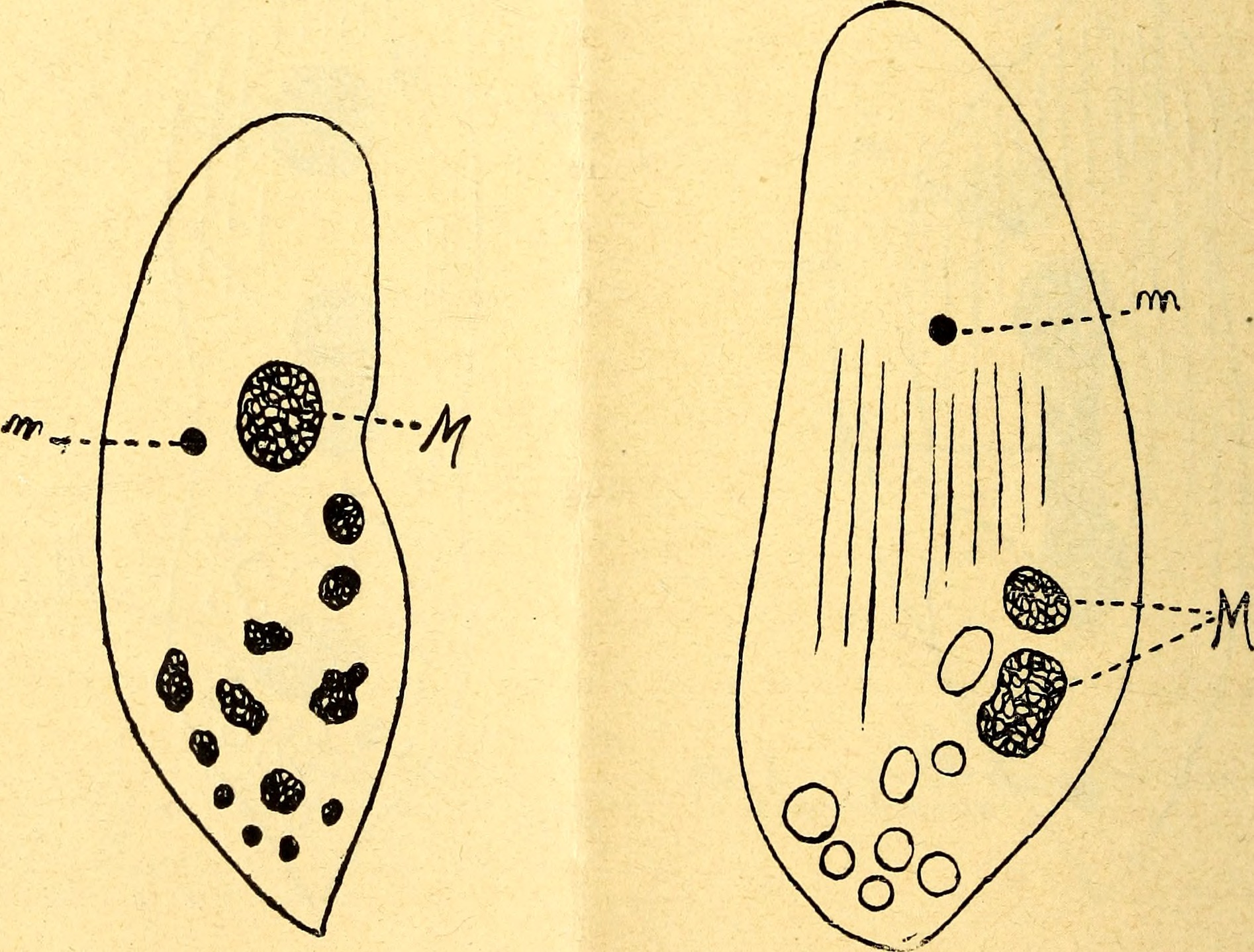
- Cryptochilum - Illustration in Bullettino delle sedute della Accademia gioenia di scienze naturali in Catania, 1893

Scientific classification
- Domain: Eukaryota
- Clade: Diaphoretickes
- Clade: SAR
- Clade: Alveolata
- Phylum: Ciliophora
- Class: Oligohymenophorea
- Order: Philasterida
- Family: Cryptochilidae; Berger in Corliss, 1979

Genera
- Biggaria; Cryptochilum

= Cryptochilidae =

Family of single-celled organisms

Cryptochilidae is a family of marine ciliates in the order Philasterida.
