= Uronema =

Uronema may refer to:

- Uronema (ciliate) (Uronema Dujardin, 1841)
- Uronema (green alga) (Uronema Lagerheim, 1887)
