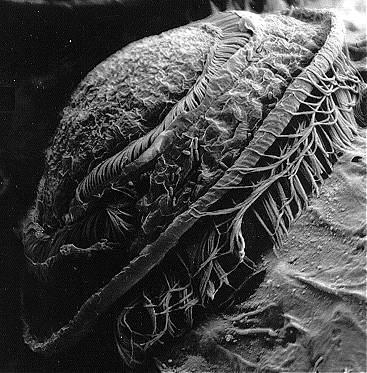
- Scanning electron micrograph of Trichodina on the gills of a mullet

Scientific classification
- Domain: Eukaryota
- Clade: Sar
- Clade: Alveolata
- Phylum: Ciliophora
- Class: Oligohymenophorea
- Subclass: Peritrichia
- Order: Mobilida; Kahl, 1933

Families
- Leiotrochidae; Polycyclidae; Trichodinidae; Trichodinopsidae; Urceolariidae

= Mobilida =

Order of protists belonging to the ciliates phylum

Mobilida is a group of parasitic or symbiotic peritrich ciliates, comprising more than 280 species. Mobilids live on or within a wide variety of aquatic organisms, including fish, amphibians, molluscs, cnidarians, flatworms and other ciliates, attaching to their host organism by means of an aboral adhesive disk. Some mobilid species are pathogens of wild or farmed fish, causing severe and economically damaging diseases such as trichodinosis.

== Morphology and feeding ==
As the name suggests, mobilida cells are mobile, capable of moving about on the body of a host organism, and of swimming between hosts. This sets them apart from the predominantly sessile peritrichs of the order Sessilida, such as Vorticella and Epistylis, which, during the feeding, or vegetative, phase of the life cycle remain attached to submerged surfaces, often by means of a stalk.

Like all peritrichs, the mobilids possess a spiral wreathe of cilia running counterclockwise around the oral region (peristome), at the anterior of the cell. Ciliature on the body is restricted to a posterior wreathe called the "trochal band," made up of three rings of cilia girdling the aboral region of the cell. This trochal band is also found in sessilid peritrichs, where it is ciliated only during the swarmer (telotroch) phase of the cell's life, during which the organism can swim freely. In mobilid ciliates, the trochal band is a permanent feature of the cell.

Mobilids possess a conspicuous "adhesive disk" at the aboral (posterior) pole, enabling the organism to attach itself temporarily to its host organism. This disk is radially symmetrical and composed of interlocking curved denticles and associated fibres. The perimeter of the disk can be contracted, allowing it to act as a sucker to hold the ciliate against the surface of its host while it feeds. Because the adhesive disk is a complex and variable structure, and clearly visible in the light microscope, it has been used by taxonomists to differentiate between species and genera within Mobilida.

Mobilids typically feed commensally on bacteria and organic debris surrounding their host, but can also consume epithelial cells and other cellular matter shed by the host itself.

== Classification ==
The order Mobilida was created in 1933 by Alfred Kahl, and is usually placed, along with its sister group Sessilida, within the subclass Peritrichia.

Some molecular phylogenetic studies, based mostly on small subunit rRNA, have raised doubts that Mobilida and Sessilida are sister taxa, indicating that the groups belong to separate lineages within the class Oligohymenophorea. In 2009, on the basis of such findings, Zifeng Zhan and his collaborators removed the mobilids from Peritrichia and elevated them to the subclass Mobilia. More recently, in a revised classification of Ciliophora drawing on both molecular and morphological data, researchers have reaffirmed the traditional grouping of Mobilida with Sessilida. A phylogenomic study released in September, 2016 robustly supports the classical view that Mobilida and Sessilida are sister clades within a monophyletic Peritrichia.

Five families are recognized within the order: Leiotrochidae, Polycyclidae, Trichodinidae, Trichodinopsidae and Urceolariidae.
