= Philaster =

Philaster may refer to:

- Philastrius (died 390s), bishop of Brescia in the fourth century
- Philaster (play), play by Francis Beaumont and John Fletcher, published in 1620
- Philaster (genus), a genus of ciliates in the family Philasteridae
