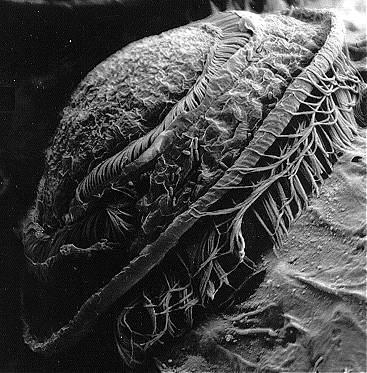
- Scanning electron micrograph of Trichodina on the gills of a mullet

Scientific classification
- Domain: Eukaryota
- Clade: Sar
- Clade: Alveolata
- Phylum: Ciliophora
- Class: Oligohymenophorea
- Order: Mobilida
- Family: Trichodinidae; Claus, 1951

= Trichodinidae =

Family of single-celled organisms

Trichodinidae is a family of ciliates of the order Mobilida, class Oligohymenophorea. Members of the family are ectoparasites (or, alternatively, ectocommensals) of a wide variety of aquatic organisms, including fish, amphibians, hydrozoans, molluscs and crustaceans.

== Genera ==
The family consists of eight genera.

- Dipartiella Stein, 1961
- Hemitrichodina Basson & Van As, 1989
- Pallitrichodina Van As & Basson in Aesch, 2001
- Paratrichodina Lom, 1963
- Semitrichodina Kazubski, 1958
- Trichodina Ehrenberg, 1830
- Trichodinella Srámek-Husek, 1953
- Tripartiella Lom, 1963
