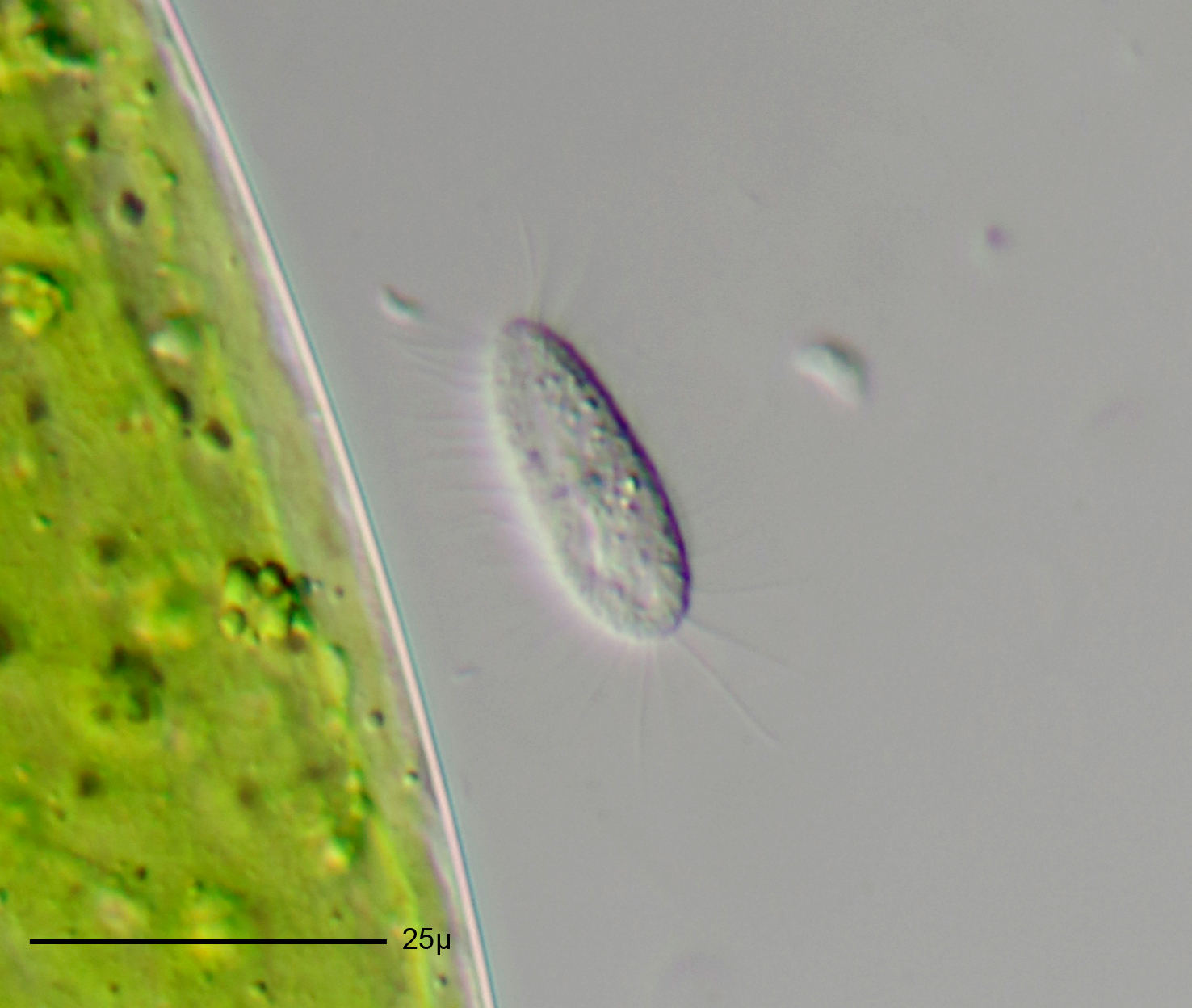
- Uronema nigricans

Scientific classification
- Domain: Eukaryota
- Clade: Diaphoretickes
- Clade: SAR
- Clade: Alveolata
- Phylum: Ciliophora
- Class: Oligohymenophorea
- Order: Philasterida
- Family: Uronematidae
- Genus: Uronema; Dujardin, 1841

Species
- Several, including: Uronema elegans (Maupas) Hamburger & Buddenbrock, 1911; Uronema marinum

= Uronema (ciliate) =

Genus of single-celled organisms

Uronema is a genus of ciliates in the family Uronematidae.
