= Thigmophryidae =

Scientific classification
- Domain: Eukaryota
- Clade: Diaphoretickes
- Clade: SAR
- Clade: Alveolata
- Phylum: Ciliophora
- Class: Oligohymenophorea
- Order: Philasterida
- Family: Thigmophryidae; Chatton & Lwoff, 1926

Genera
- Myxophyllum Raabe, 1934; Thigmophrya Chatton & Lwoff, 1923

Family of single-celled organisms

Thigmophryidae is a family of marine ciliates in the order Philasterida.
