= Pleuronematida =

Scientific classification
- Domain: Eukaryota
- Clade: Sar
- Clade: Alveolata
- Phylum: Ciliophora
- Class: Oligohymenophorea
- Subclass: Scuticociliatia
- Order: Pleuronematida; Fauré-Fremiet in Corliss, 1956

Families
- Calyptotrichidae Small & Lynn, 1985; Ctedoctematidae Small & Lynn, 1985; Cyclidiidae Ehrenberg, 1838; Dragescoidae Jankowksi, 1980; Histiobalantiidae de Puytorac & Corliss in Corliss, 1979; Peniculistomatidae Fenchel, 1965; Pleuronematidae Kent, 1881

Order of single-celled organisms

Pleuronematida is an order of predominantly free-living ciliates in the subclass Scuticociliatia.
