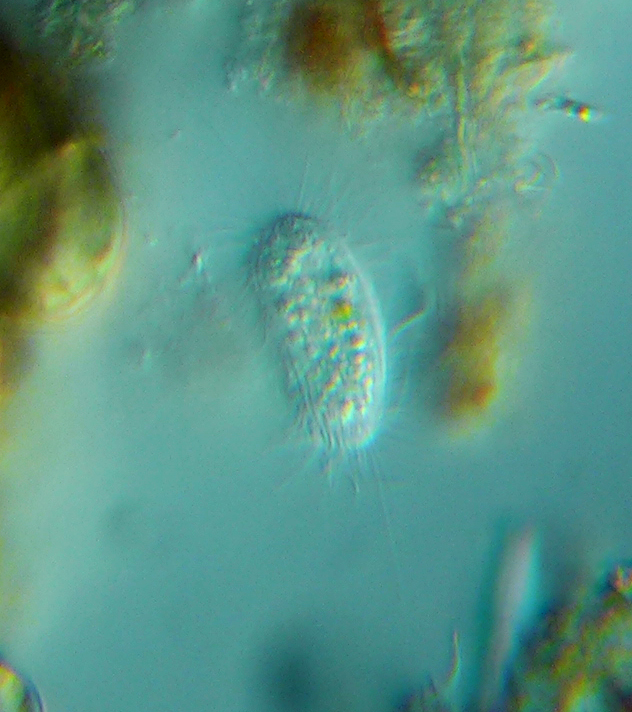
- Uronema nigricans

Scientific classification
- Domain: Eukaryota
- Clade: Diaphoretickes
- Clade: Sar
- Clade: Alveolata
- Phylum: Ciliophora
- Class: Oligohymenophorea
- Order: Philasterida
- Family: Uronematidae; Thompson, 1964

Genera
- Homalogastra; Urocyclon; Uronema; Uronemella; Uropedalium

= Uronematidae =

Family of single-celled organisms

Uronematidae is a family of ciliates in the order Philasterida.
