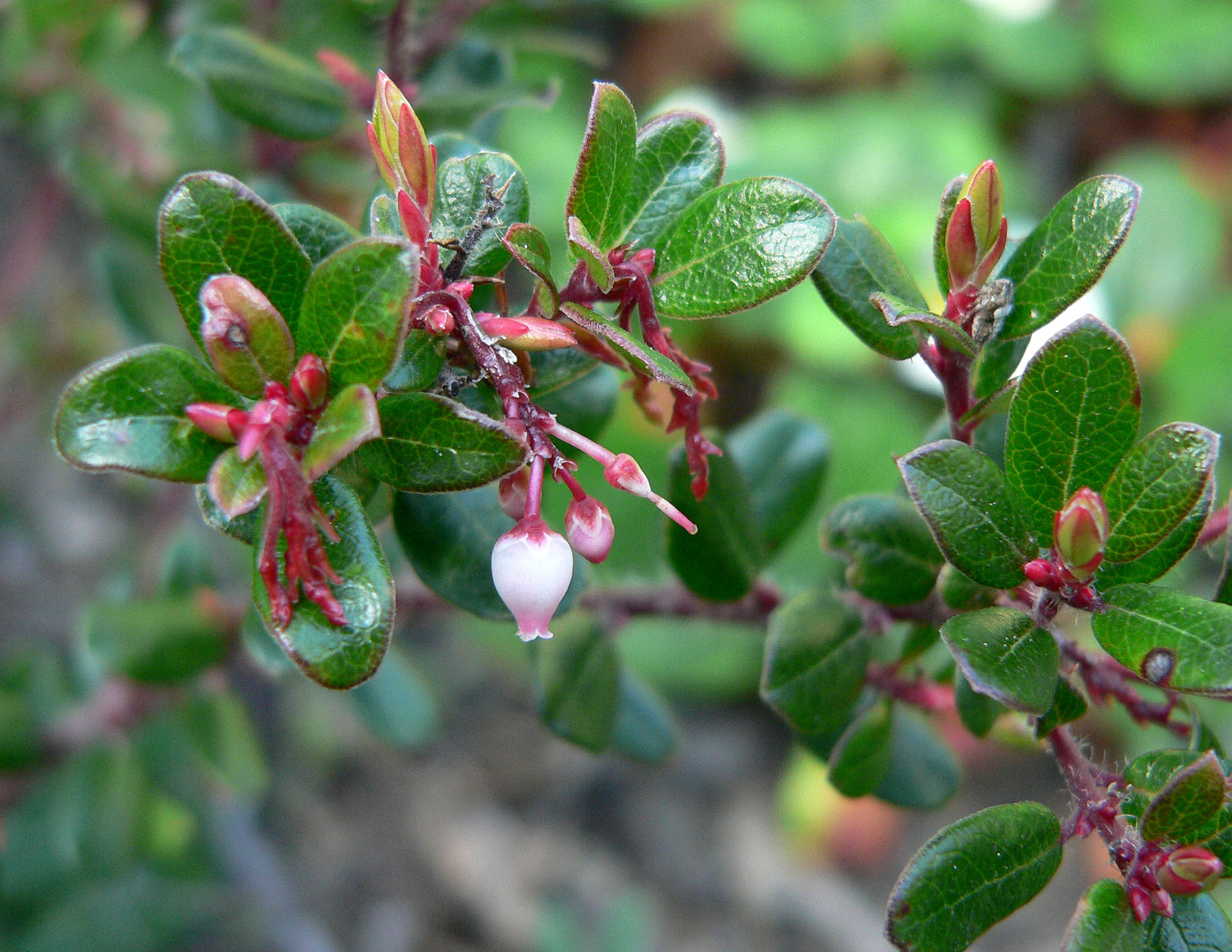

Scientific classification
- Kingdom: Plantae
- Clade: Tracheophytes
- Clade: Angiosperms
- Clade: Eudicots
- Clade: Asterids
- Order: Ericales
- Family: Ericaceae
- Genus: Arctostaphylos
- Species: A. nummularia

Binomial name
- Arctostaphylos nummularia Gray

Synonyms
- Arctostaphylos sensitiva

= Arctostaphylos nummularia =

Species of flowering plant

Arctostaphylos nummularia is a species of manzanita known by the common names glossyleaf manzanita, dwarf manzanita and Fort Bragg manzanita. It is endemic to California, where it grows in the forests of the coastal and inland ranges north of the San Francisco Bay.

== Taxonomy ==
One subspecies is the pygmy manzanita (Arctostaphylos nummularia subsp. mendocinoensis), which is endemic to Mendocino County, California, where it is found in the pygmy forests near the coast.

== Description ==
Arctostaphylos nummularia is a red-barked shrub reaching a maximum height between one and two meters. The smaller twigs are covered lightly in white glandular bristles. The leaves are oval-shaped to nearly round, one to two centimeters long and wide. The edges are very finely toothed to nearly smooth, lined with tiny bristles, and sometimes curled under. The upper surface of the leaf is darker green and shinier than the underside.

The inflorescence holds a cluster of hanging flowers, which are spherical and white to pink-tinged. The fruit is a cylindrical drupe less than half a centimeter long containing a few seeds.
