= Astome =

Astomes

Scientific classification
- Domain: Eukaryota
- Clade: Sar
- Superphylum: Alveolata
- Phylum: Ciliophora
- Class: Oligohymenophorea
- Subclass: Astomatia; Schewiakoff, 1896
- Order: Astomatida; Schewiakoff, 1896

Families
- Anoplophryidae; Archiastomatidae; Clausilocolidae; Contophryidae; Haptophryidae; Hoplitophryidae; Intoshellinidae; Maupasellidae; Radiophryidae

Order of protozoans

Astomes (order Astomatida) are a group of ciliate eukaryotes commonly found in the guts of annelid worms, especially oligochaetes, and other invertebrates. As their name implies, these parasites are characterized by an absence of mouth. The cell is covered by uniform cilia; in addition, some astomes attach themselves to their hosts by suckers, while others use various hooks or barbs.

Asexual reproduction is by transverse fission. In some cases, chains of individuals form by repeated fission without separation of the cells. The sexual phenomenon of conjugation also occurs. Representative genera include Cepedietta, which lives in the amphibian digestive system, and Radiophrya.
