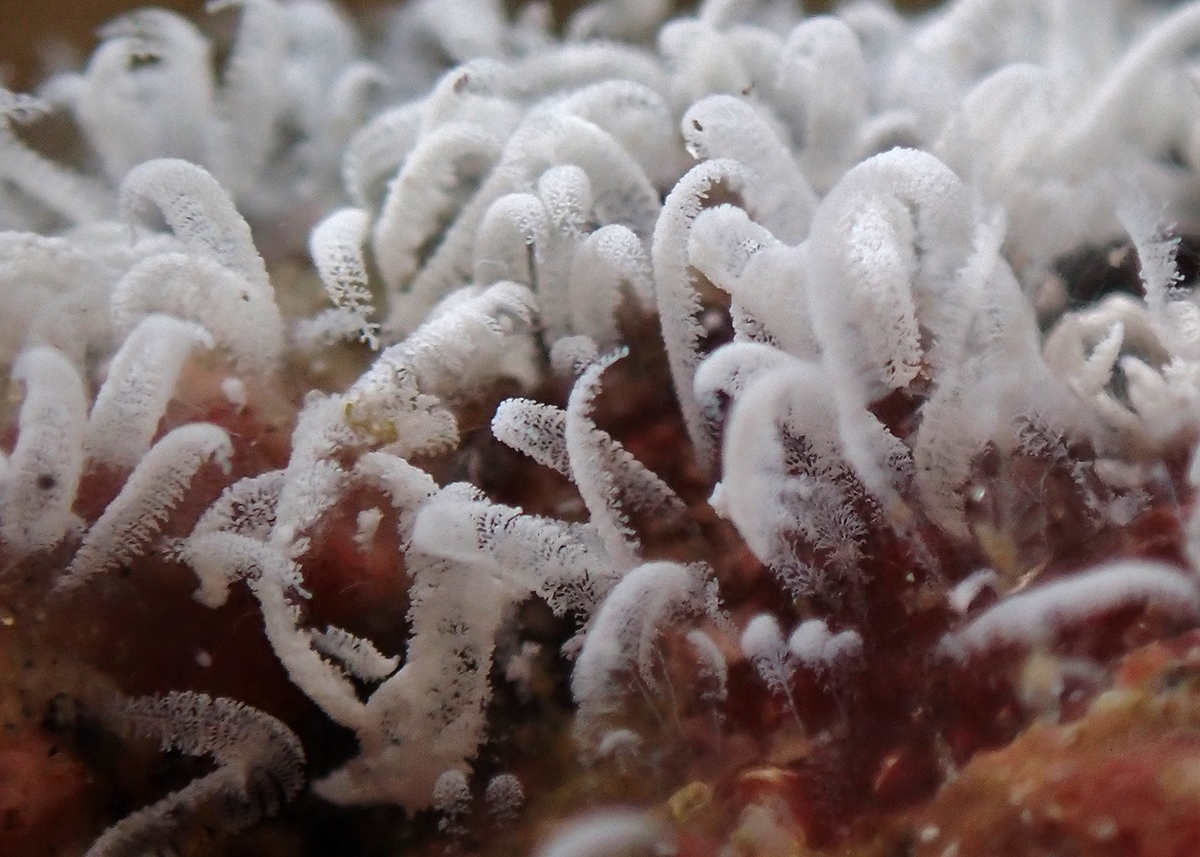
- A colony observed in situ at Réunion island

Scientific classification
- Domain: Eukaryota
- Clade: Sar
- Clade: Alveolata
- Phylum: Ciliophora
- Class: Oligohymenophorea
- Order: Sessilida
- Family: Zoothamniidae
- Genus: Zoothamnium
- Species: Z. niveum

Binomial name
- Zoothamnium niveum Ehrenberg, 1838

= Zoothamnium niveum =

Species of single-celled organism

Zoothamnium niveum is a species of ciliate protozoan which forms feather-shaped colonies in marine coastal environments. The ciliates form a symbiosis with sulfur-oxidizing chemosynthetic bacteria of the species "Candidatus Thiobios zoothamnicoli", which live on the surface of the colonies and give them their unusual white color.

== Characteristics ==
The conspicuously white and feather-shaped colonies are composed of individual bell-shaped cells known as zooids. The stalks of individual cells grow from a single central stalk. Colonies can reach a length of up to 15 mm, formed from hundreds of single zooids, each with a length of only 120 μm. An entire colony can contract into a ball-shaped bunch through the contraction of myonemes in their stalks.

The white color is produced by chemolithoautotrophic sulfur-oxidizing bacteria, which cover the entire surface of the Z. niveum colony. In most other species of Zoothamnium, bacteria are only known to cover the stalks. The bacteria contain elemental sulfur, which appears white. Z. niveum appears colorless when the bacteria are absent.

Like in other ciliates, a contractile vacuole maintains osmotic balance for the cell, and allows it to survive the salt concentrations in both marine and brackish water. The vacuole is located in Z. niveum directly below the lip of the peristome.

== Polymorphism ==
Most ciliates live as single-celled organisms in aquatic environments, and the single cell carries out all functions of life, such as nutrition, metabolism, and reproduction. Colonies of Z. niveum are composed of numerous individual cells that form a feather-like colonial unit, with several different cell types. Old branches of the colony illustrate the polymorphism of the zooids when viewed under the microscope. Three different forms of the individual ciliate cells are present, which are distinct in both form and function. The large macrozooids can transform into swarmers and leave the colony. They settle on suitable surfaces and develop into new colonies. The microzooids are small cells specialized for feeding, which the colony does by consumption of their symbiotic bacteria and other organic particles. At the terminal ends of the colony are specialized zooids that can elongate and facilitate the asexual reproduction of the colony.

The bacteria on different parts of a host have different shapes despite belonging to the same species (polymorphism). Those on the stalks are shaped like rods, but those in the region of the ciliated oral apparatus of the microzooids are shaped like small spheres (coccoid). Intermediate forms are also found in between.

== Distribution and habitat ==
The sessile colonies of Z. niveum were first described from the shallow waters of the Red Sea. They were later also found in the Florida Keys in the Gulf of Mexico, and at the Belize Barrier Reef in the Caribbean Sea.

The colonies settle in environments that contain sulfide. Hydrogen sulfide, sulfide, and related sulfur-containing compounds like thiosulfate are produced during the decomposition and remineralization of organic material. For example, plant material like the torn-off leaves of Posidonia oceanica in seagrass meadows of the Mediterranean accumulate in depressions of rocky ledges and decompose. In mangrove forests of the Caribbean, organic material can form peat and release sulfide. Hydrogen sulfide can also originate from geological phenomena such as at underwater hydrothermal vents, e.g. off the Canary Islands.

== Ecological conditions ==
Extreme ecological conditions prevail at these sources of sulfide close to which colonies of Z. niveum settle. Because there is little water current under mangrove roots and at seagrass deposits under rock ledges, these decomposition hot-spots are extremely poor in oxygen and rich in sulfide. In mangrove forests off the coast of Belize, they have been found around small holes in the mangrove peat which form when the mangrove rootlets decompose. These openings have been called sulfide "microvent[s]", because they resemble in miniature the hydrothermal vents of the deep sea, the so-called black smokers, although the temperatures in shallow waters are much lower (28 °C in the Caribbean, 21 °C-25 °C in the Mediterranean (summer)), compared to the gradient between >300 °C and 2 °C in the deep sea because of volcanic activity. The Zoothamnium colonies do not settle directly over the decomposing material, but nearby e.g. on overhanging rocks, leaves of seagrass or seaweed, or mangrove roots.

== Symbiosis ==
The symbiotic benefits provided by the colonies of Z. niveum for its attached ectosymbiotic bacteria Candidatus Thiobios zoothamnicoli (a member of the Gammaproteobacteria), which are vertically transmitted to its host, are its active alternation between oxygen-rich and sulfide-rich conditions. This alternation can occur through the regular contraction and extension of the colonies and through the water currents set up by the beating of the cilia in the region of the oral opening of the ciliates.

The rapid contraction and slow re-extension of the colonies causes a flow of both sulfide-rich water for the feeding of the bacteria and normal oxygenated seawater for the respiration of Z. niveum. Through the beating of its cilia at the oral apparatus of Zoothamnium is the mixing regulated. When there is a low supply of sulfur compounds, the bacteria use the sulfur that is stored inside their cells. They eventually appear pale and transparent after four hours because the stored sulfur has been consumed. However, if the sulfide concentration is too high, it can be toxic to the Zoothamnium colonies and kill the ciliates despite the bacteria.

Bacteria close to the oral end of the microzooids have a coccoid form, a larger volume, and a higher division rate than the rod-shaped bacteria on the stalks, despite both belonging to the same species. This is because the mixing of water by the beating of the oral cilia result in a more optimal concentration of both oxygen and sulfide in the water there. The bacteria at the oral region can thus be used as a food source and are swirled into the mouth (cytostome) of the ciliate and digested.

== Literature ==
- Christian Rinke, Jörg A. Ott und Monika Bright: "Nutritional processes in the chemoautotrophic Zoothamnium niveum symbioses", Symposium of the Biology of Tropical Shallow Water Habitats, Lunz, Österreich, Oktober 2001, S. 19-21
