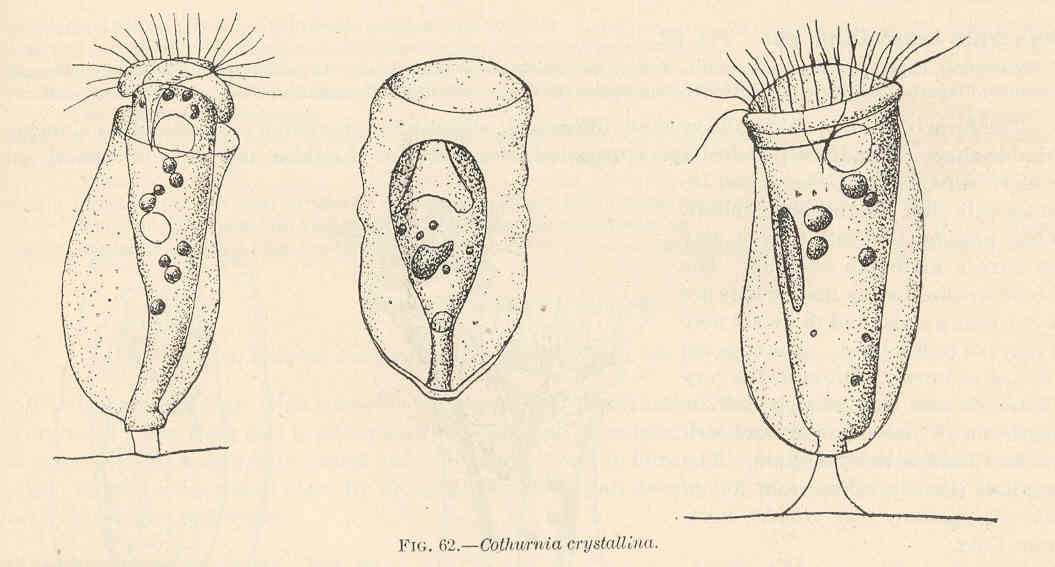
- Cothurnia crystallini

Scientific classification
- Domain: Eukaryota
- Clade: Diaphoretickes
- Clade: Sar
- Clade: Alveolata
- Phylum: Ciliophora
- Class: Oligohymenophorea
- Order: Sessilida
- Family: Vaginicolidae de Fromentel, 1874

Genera
- Cothurnia; Platycola; Pyxicola; Thuricola; Vaginicola

= Vaginicolidae =

Family of single-celled organisms

Vaginicolidae is a family of peritrichs in the order Sessilida.
