= Spasmoneme =

Structure found in some eukaryotic organisms

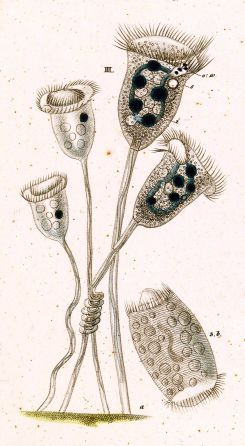
Vorticella convallaria as illustrated by C.G. Ehrenberg in 1838

A Spasmoneme (or myoneme) is a contractile structure found in some eukaryotic single-celled organisms, particularly Vorticella which relies on the movement of calcium ions instead of ATP for contraction, unlike many other eukaryotic motors. The structure is composed of a series of protein filaments, each about 2nm in diameter, made up of 40-60% by the calcium binding protein family collectively called spasmin. These filaments have a relaxed structure of a tightly coiled helix.

While the specific mechanism of the spasmoneme is not completely understood, it is thought that negative charges on the filaments generate an electrostatic force that pushes the layers of the stalk away from each other, stretching the structure in a straight line surrounded by a lipid bilayer. During contraction, calcium-stimulated calcium release from a compartment membrane lining the outside of the stalk allows positively charged calcium ions to flow through the membrane and associate with the protein filaments, thereby balancing out the charge, allowing the individual sub-units to collapse to a more favorable configuration becoming a rubber-like matrix and assuming it's natural helix formation.

There remains much to doubt about the current model, and because the spasmoneme has never been reconstructed in vitro, the building block spasmin may not even be the contractile filament. The triggering process of calcium release is also uncertain.

The resulting shortening can be up to 172 lengths per second, such as in zoothamnium, limited only by the speed of calcium diffusion across the membrane, giving it a faster contraction than any other biological motor and ranking among the most powerful in terms of specific power. The relaxation time is several seconds (compared to approximately one tenth of a second for muscle) as intercellular membrane compartments must again sequester calcium ions moving against both their electrical and osmotic gradients. The myonemes of Acantharea also display slow contraction and undulation movements.
