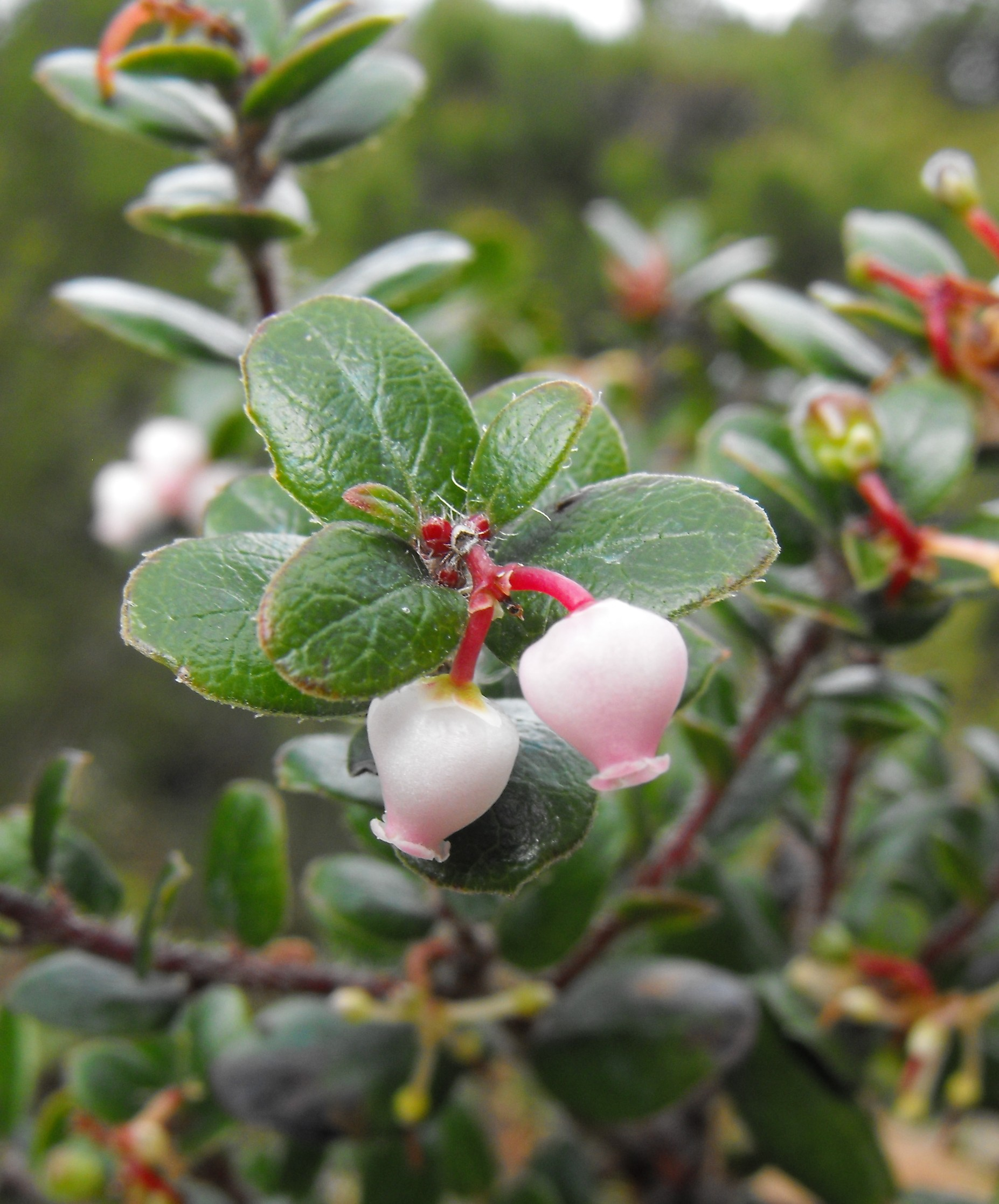

Scientific classification
- Kingdom: Plantae
- Clade: Tracheophytes
- Clade: Angiosperms
- Clade: Eudicots
- Clade: Asterids
- Order: Ericales
- Family: Ericaceae
- Genus: Arctostaphylos
- Species: A. nummularia
- Subspecies: A. n. subsp. mendocinoensis

Trinomial name
- Arctostaphylos nummularia subsp. mendocinoensis (P.V.Wells) V.T.Parker, M.C.Vasey & J.E.Keeley

Synonyms
- Arctostaphylos mendocinoensis P.V.Wells

= Arctostaphylos nummularia subsp. mendocinoensis =

Species of flowering plant

Arctostaphylos nummularia subsp. mendocinoensis, commonly known as pygmy manzanita, is a subspecies of manzanita. It is endemic to Mendocino County, California, where it is known from scattered occurrences in the pygmy forests near the coast.

== Description ==
This is a small, mat-forming shrub growing in low mounds less than half a meter tall. It has red, shreddy bark and bristles along its smaller branches. The leaves are dark green, shiny, convex, and hairless, and rarely more than a centimeter long. The inflorescence is a dense cluster of urn-shaped flowers with four tiny lobes at the mouth. The fruit is a cylindrical drupe only a few millimeters long, containing four minute seeds.
