= Scuticociliatia =

Scientific classification
- Domain: Eukaryota
- Clade: Sar
- Clade: Alveolata
- Phylum: Ciliophora
- Class: Oligohymenophorea
- Subclass: Scuticociliatia; Small, 1967

Orders
- Philasterida; Pleuronematida; Thigmotrichida

Subclass of single-celled organisms

Scuticociliatia is a subclass of ciliates in the class Oligohymenophorea. Its members are called scuticociliates. These unicellular eukaryotes are microorganisms that are usually free-living and can be found in freshwater, marine, and soil habitats. Around 20 members of the group have been identified as causative agents of the disease scuticociliatosis, in which the ciliates are parasites of other marine organisms. Species known to be susceptible include a broad range of teleosts, seahorses, sharks, and some crustaceans. Since 2022 there have also been several reports that scuticociliates might be responsible for mass die-off events of sea urchins across the world's oceans.
