= Scuticociliatosis =

Parasitic infection

Scuticociliatosis is a severe and often fatal parasitic infection of several groups of marine organisms. Species known to be susceptible include a broad range of teleosts, seahorses, sharks, and some crustaceans. The disease can be caused by any one of about 20 distinct species of unicellular eukaryotes known as scuticociliates, which are free-living marine microorganisms that are opportunistic or facultative parasites. Scuticociliatosis has been described in the wild, in captive animals in aquariums, and in aquaculture. It is best studied in fish species that are commonly farmed, in which typical effects of infection include skin ulceration, hemorrhage, and necrosis, with post-mortem examination identifying ciliates in the skin, gills, blood, and internal organs including the brain.

== Host range ==
Scuticociliatosis has been reported in a broad range of teleosts; it is best studied in those teleost fish commonly raised in aquaculture, where the disease is of significant economic impact. It has also been reported in seahorses, sharks, and crustaceans. The mortality rate is particularly high among flatfish, possibly due to their sedentary lifestyle involving skin-to-skin contact between individuals. Since 2022 there have also been several reports that scuticociliates might be responsible for mass die-off events of sea urchins across the world's oceans.

== Disease mechanism ==
Scuticociliatosis consists of overwhelming infection of an animal's body by any one of around 20 species of scuticociliate. These unicellular organisms are free-living in marine environments but are opportunistic parasites with a diverse host range. It is unclear what triggers infection, although infection rates are known to be higher, in both experimental and aquaculture conditions, in warmer water. Low salinity has also been reported to reduce disease rates. Under some conditions, ciliates have been reported to successfully infect healthy fish, likely through the gills; other reports suggest abrasions or skin damage may be required. Scuticociliates are histophagous (tissue-eating) and extensively degrade body tissues. Histological postmortem examination of affected fish usually reveals ciliates in the skin and gills, blood, and internal organs, with significant damage to the brain and nervous system, which is likely responsible for behaviors such as abnormal swimming in infected individuals.

== Causative agents ==
The exact species of scuticociliate responsible for a given outbreak is often not identified. As a result, differences in virulence and disease course among different scuticociliates are not well characterized. In one study, infection by Miamiensis avidus was reported to have a higher mortality rate than Pseudocohnilembus persalinus, Pseudocohnilembus hargisi and Uronema marinum. Infections by U. marinum show a less severe disease course, possibly restricted to the skin surface; it has been suggested that this ciliate may be only a secondary pathogen. M. avidus, P. persalinus, U. marinum, and U. nigricans have all been reported in aquaculture settings.

== Outbreaks ==
Scuticociliatosis outbreaks are recurring problems in fisheries, especially of olive flounder. Outbreaks in both aquaculture and natural settings are more common in the spring and summer, when water temperature is higher. Outbreaks have also been identified in captive settings; in one aquarium an outbreak of M. avidus was responsible for the deaths of six sharks.

Scuticociliatosis due to Miamiensis avidus infection is believed to be responsible for a 2017 die-off of fish and leopard sharks found in the San Francisco Bay.

== Treatment and prevention ==
There is no treatment for scuticociliatosis once parasites have infected an animal's internal organs. In aquaculture settings, chemical treatment of the water to kill ciliates can be used in conjunction with antibiotics.
