= Telotroch =

Order of single-celled organisms

Telotroch is the free-swimming stage of members of the order Sessilida. Sessilida are ciliates of the subclass Peritrichia.

A sessile individual can turn into a motile one to migrate to a better place.

Vorticella reverts to a telotroch note time stop in lower righthand corner.

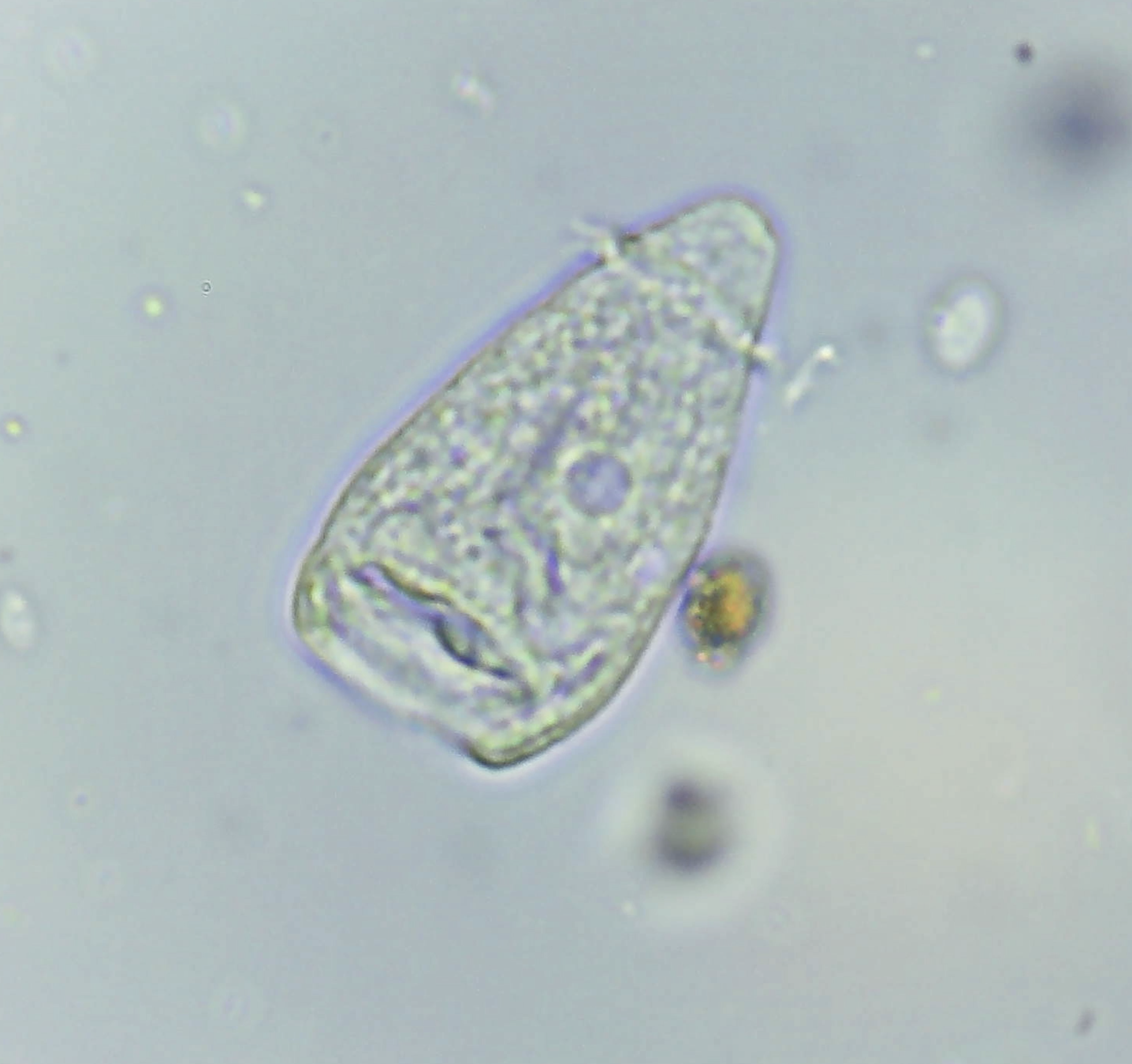
Vorticella sp. telotroch

Another definition of telotroch: a posterior tuft of cilia in larvae of some animals. See trochophore larva and hemichordates for references.
