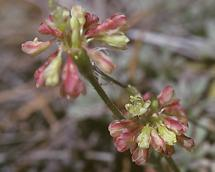

Conservation status
- Imperiled (NatureServe)

Scientific classification
- Kingdom: Plantae
- Clade: Tracheophytes
- Clade: Angiosperms
- Clade: Eudicots
- Order: Caryophyllales
- Family: Polygonaceae
- Genus: Eriogonum
- Species: E. kelloggii

Binomial name
- Eriogonum kelloggii A.Gray

Synonyms
- Eriogonum caespitosum var. kelloggii (A.Gray) M.E.Jones

= Eriogonum kelloggii =

Species of wild buckwheat

Eriogonum kelloggii is a rare species of wild buckwheat known by the common names Red Mountain buckwheat and Kellogg's buckwheat. It is endemic to Mendocino County, California, where it is known from only five occurrences on Red Mountain near Leggett (not to be confused with the town of Red Mountain in San Bernardino County). It grows in woodland habitat on serpentine soils.

== Description ==
This is a perennial herb forming a low, spreading mat with a woody caudex at the base. The oblong leaves are no more than a centimeter long and are coated with silvery, soft hairs, especially on the undersides. The inflorescence arises on an erect peduncle, bearing many tiny white to pink flowers in a headlike cluster.

This species is considered endangered by the state of California, but has no federal listing.
