= Philasteridae =

Scientific classification
- Domain: Eukaryota
- Clade: Diaphoretickes
- Clade: SAR
- Clade: Alveolata
- Phylum: Ciliophora
- Class: Oligohymenophorea
- Order: Philasterida
- Family: Philasteridae; Kahl, 1931

Genera
- Helicostoma Cohn, 1866; Madsenia Kahl, 1934; Philaster Fabre-Domergue, 1885; Philasterides Kahl, 1931; Porpostoma Moebius, 1888

Family of single-celled organisms

Philasteridae is a family of ciliates in the order Philasterida.
