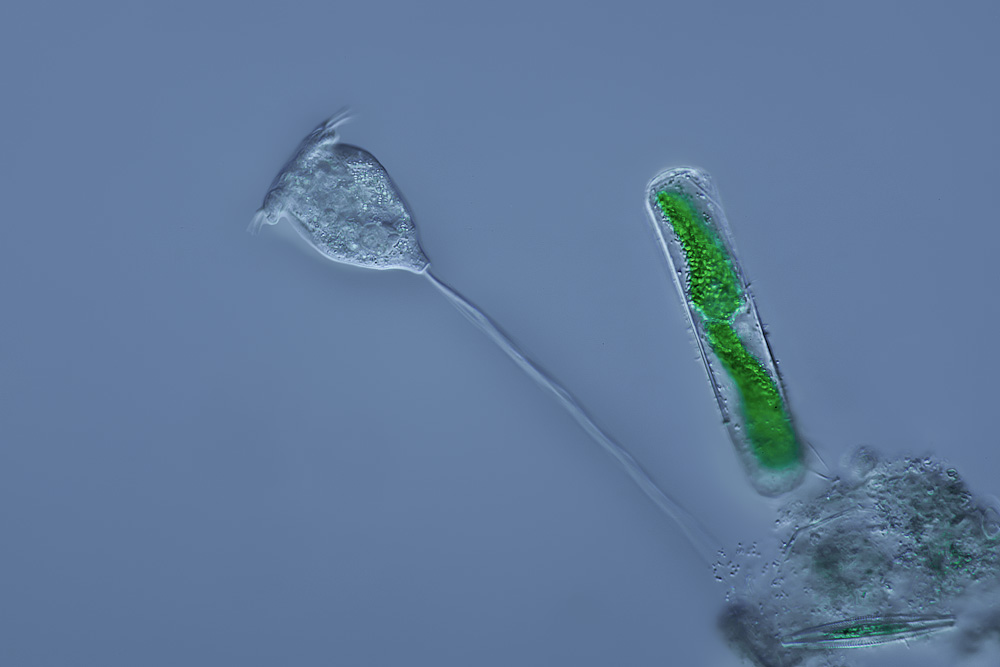

Scientific classification
- Domain: Eukaryota
- Supergroup: Alveolata
- Phylum: Ciliophora
- Class: Oligohymenophorea
- Order: Sessilida
- Family: Vorticellidae; Ehrenberg, 1838

= Vorticellidae =

Family of protozoans

Vorticellidae is a family of ciliates belonging to the order Sessilida. They are colonial or unicellular organisms that are attached to a substrate via a stalk. The distinguishing characteristic of the family is a helical spasmoneme within the stalk that is contractile.

Members of this family are common in marine, freshwater, and terrestrial habitats around the world.

== Genera ==
Genera:

- Anthochloe Joseph, 1882
- Apocarchesium Ji & Kusuoka, 2009
- Baikalaster Jankowski, 1986
- Baikalonis Jankowski, 1982
- Carchesium Ehrenberg, 1831
- Cotensita Jankowski, 1982
- Epicarchesium Jankowski, 1985
- Intranstylum Fauré-Fremiet, 1904
- Parazoothamnium Piesik, 1975
- Pelagovorticella Jankowski, 1980
- Piesika Warren, 1988
- Planeticovorticella Clamp & Coats, 2000
- Pseudovorticella Foissner & Schiffmann, 1975
- Rugaecaulis Lom & de Puytorac, 1994
- Ruthiella Schödel, 1983
- Spinivorticella Jankowski, 1993
- Tucolesca Lom in Corliss, 1979
- Vorticella Linnaeus, 1767
- Vorticellides Foissner, Blake, Wolf, Breiner & Stoeck, 2009
