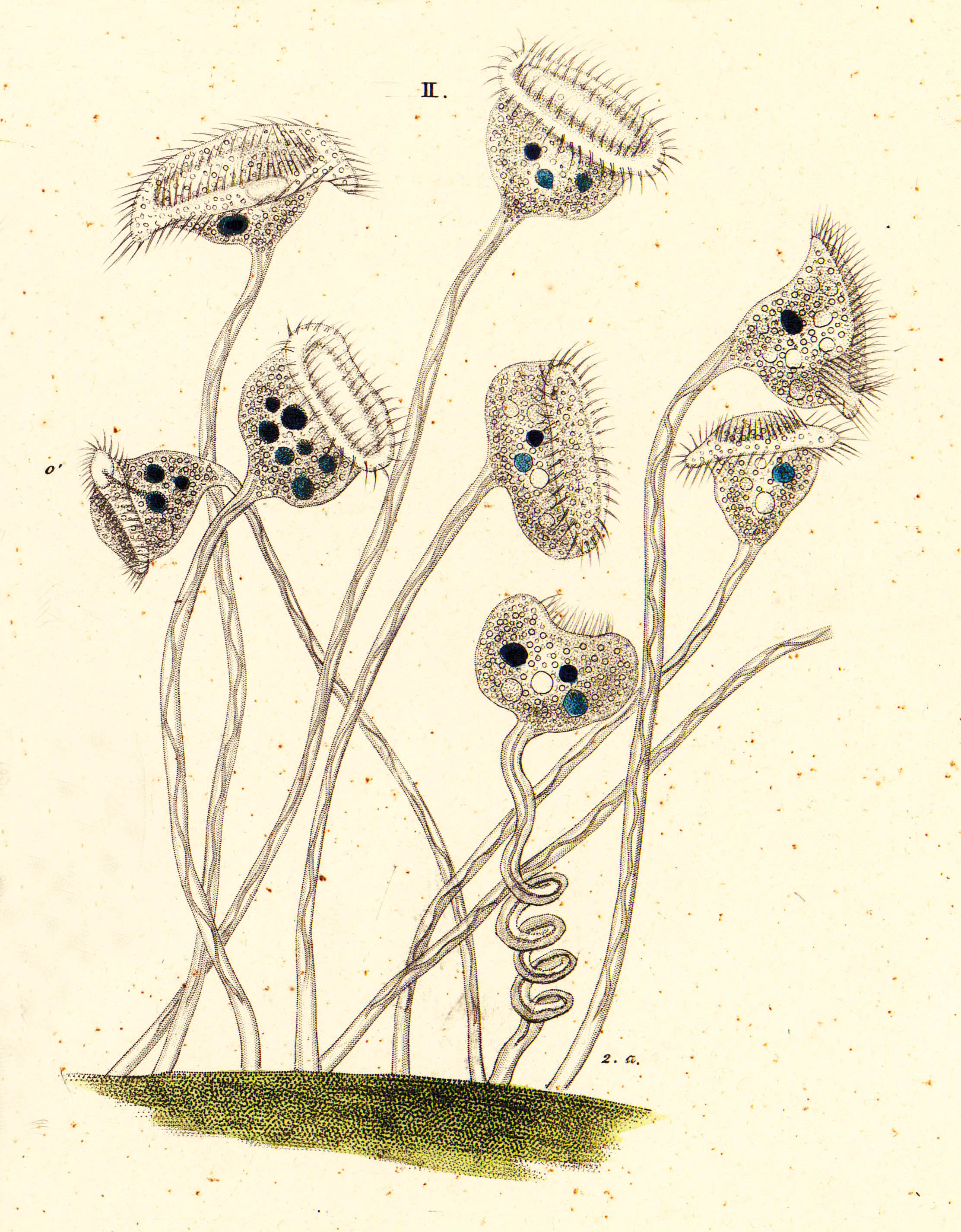
- Vorticella patellina

Scientific classification
- Domain: Eukaryota
- Clade: Sar
- Superphylum: Alveolata
- Phylum: Ciliophora
- Class: Oligohymenophorea
- Subclass: Peritrichia; Stein 1859

Orders
- Sessilida; Mobilida

= Peritrich =

Subclass of ciliate eukaryotes

The peritrichs (Latin: Peritrichia) are a large and distinctive group of ciliates.

The peritrichs were first defined by Friedrich von Stein in 1859. Initially they were considered spirotrichs, then treated as a separate category, before receiving their modern placement.

== Structure ==
They are usually bell or disc shaped, with a prominent paroral membrane arising from the oral cavity and circling counter-clockwise around the anterior of the cell, accompanied by a smaller series of membranelles. The oral cavity is apical and funnel shaped, with a contractile vacuole discharging directly into it. When disturbed, the anterior of the cell can contract. The rest of the body is unciliated, except for a telotroch band circling the posterior in mobile species and stages.

== Order Sessilida ==
The larger order of Peritrichia are the Sessilida. Most of these have modified posterior kinetosomes which secrete a contractile stalk. The unattached stage, called a telotroch, is mouthless. These are common in both freshwater and marine environments, and many live attached to aquatic plants and animals. They are either solitary or produce branched colonies. A few secrete a lorica. Vorticella is one of the best-known genera. Stalks may be as long as 2 mm, and in some cases where they are highly contractile can be extended up to 3 mm.

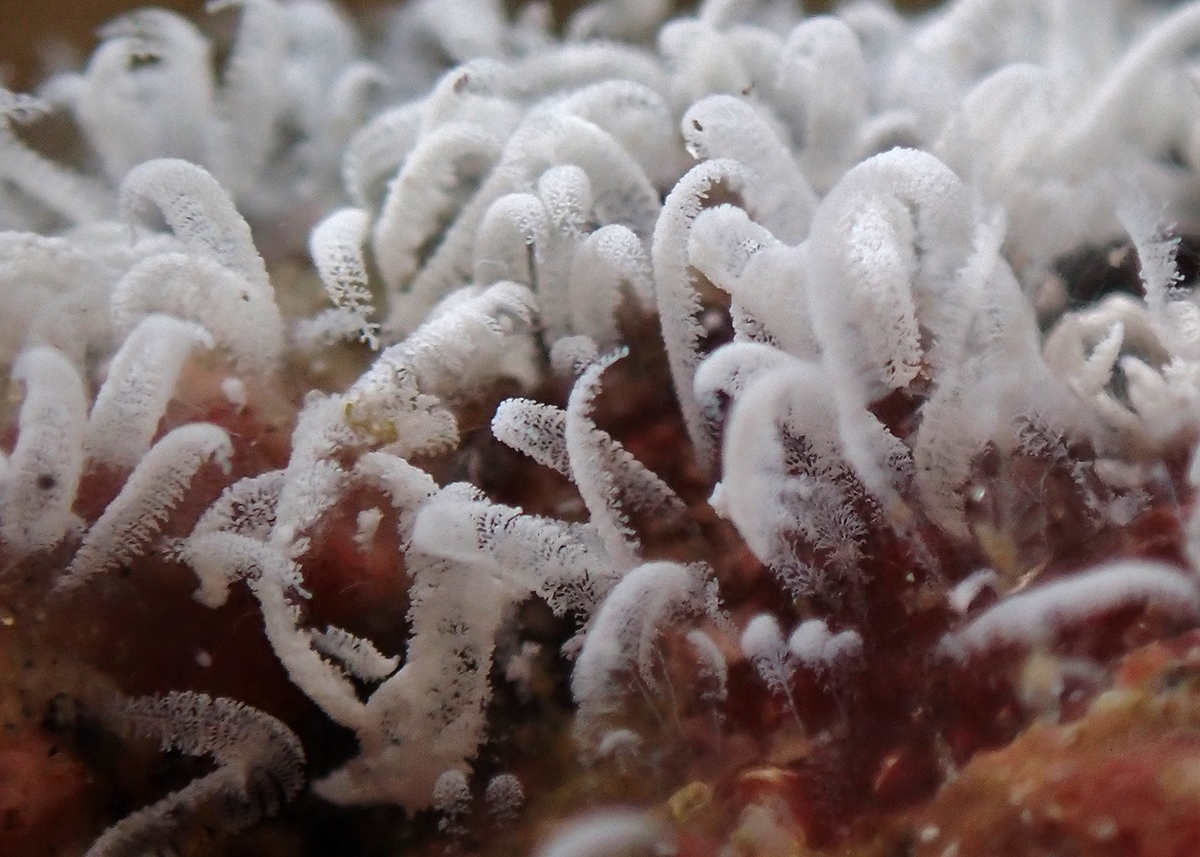
Zoothamnium niveum

== Order Mobilida ==
The other peritrichs make up the order Mobilida. In these the posterior of the cell is enlarged and modified to form a complex holdfast, allowing the cell to temporarily attach to some host organism. Most live on the integument or gills of freshwater and marine invertebrates, but other hosts occur, including fish and even other ciliates, and other locations as well. Some can be pathogenic for fish.
