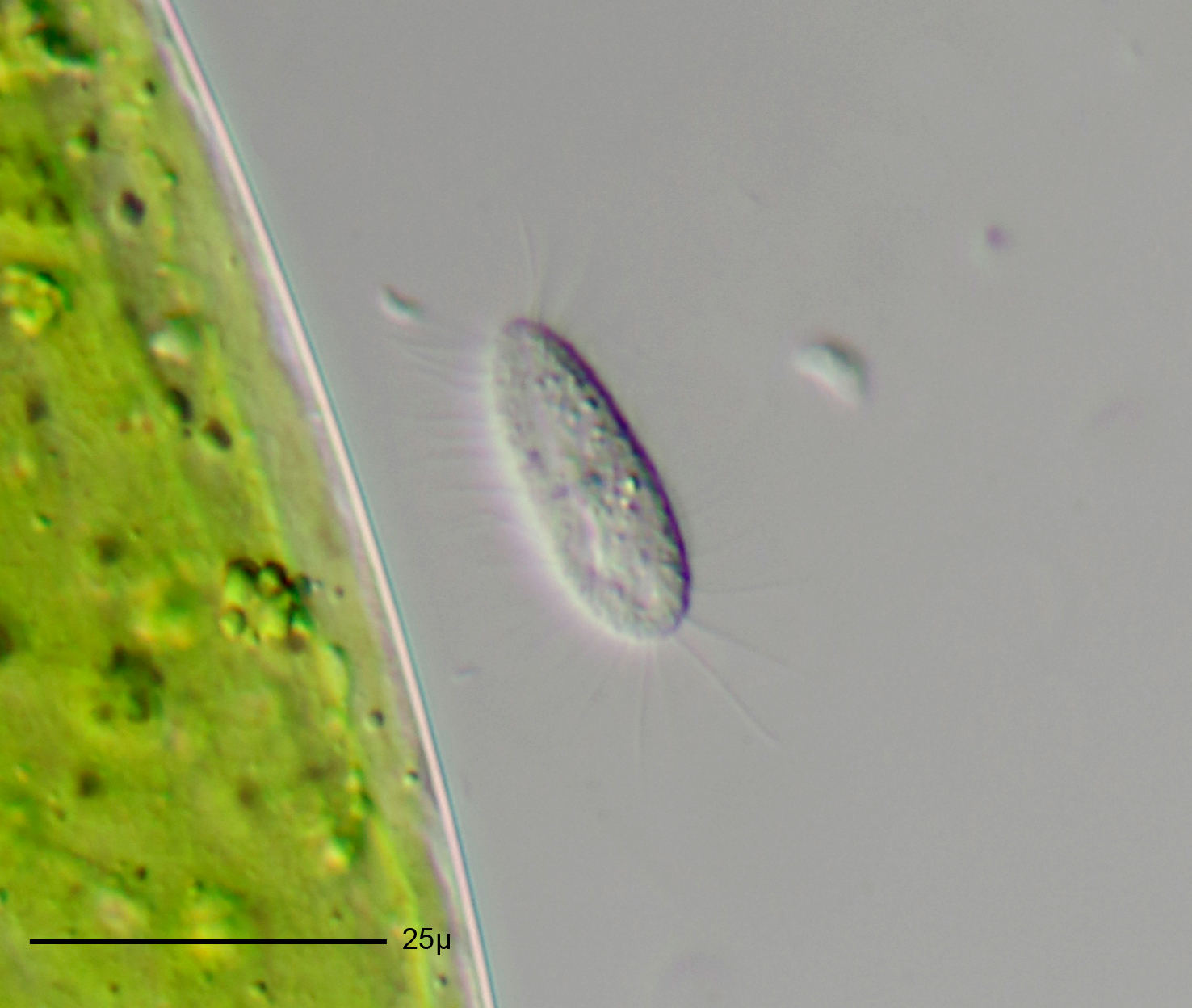
- Uronema nigricans

Scientific classification
- Domain: Eukaryota
- Clade: Diaphoretickes
- Clade: SAR
- Clade: Alveolata
- Phylum: Ciliophora
- Class: Oligohymenophorea
- Subclass: Scuticociliatia
- Order: Philasterida; Small, 1967

Families
- Cinetochilidae; Cohnilembidae; Cryptochilidae; Entodiscidae; Entorhipidiidae; Loxocephalidae; Orchitophryidae; Paralembidae; Parauronematidae; Philasteridae; Pseudocohnilembidae; Schizocaryidae; Thigmophryidae; Thyrophylacidae; Uronematidae; Philasterida incertae sedis

= Philasterida =

Order of single-celled organisms

Philasterida (the philasterid ciliates) is an order of ciliates in the subclass Scuticociliatia.
