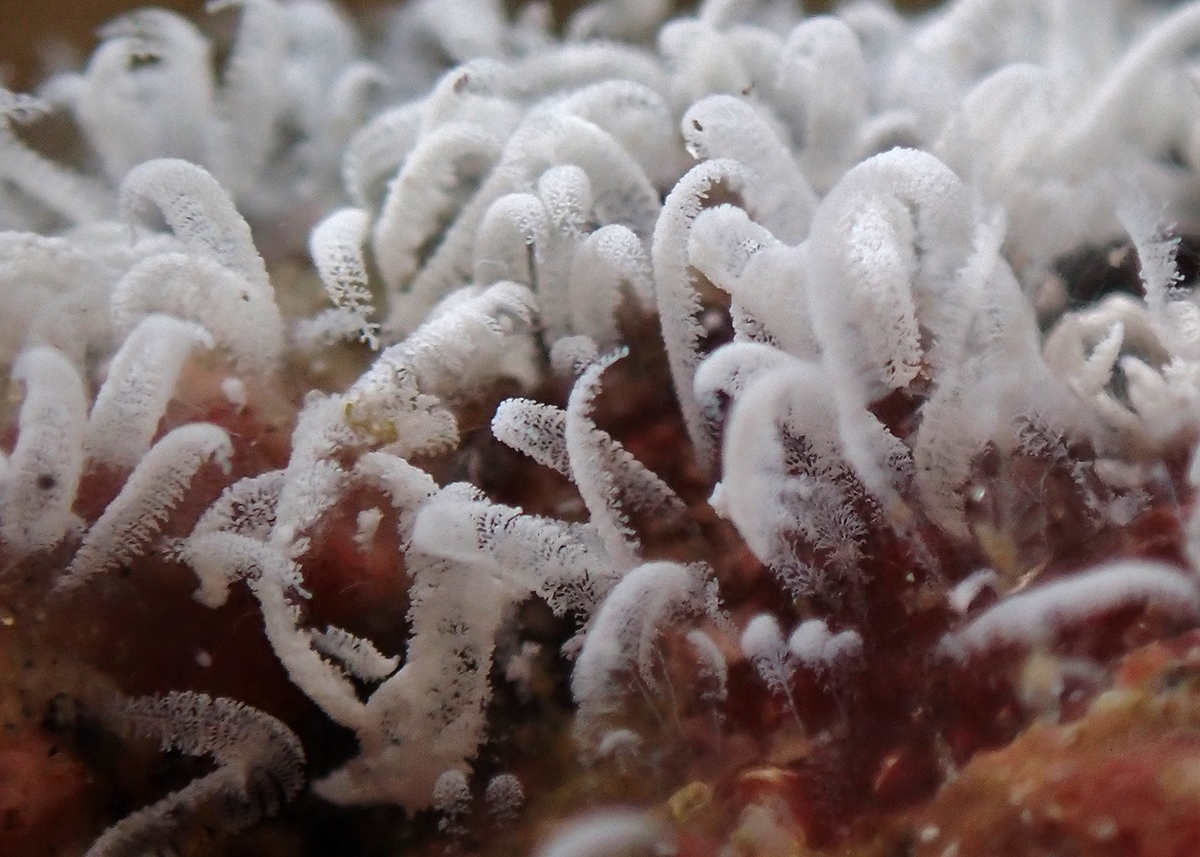
- Zoothamnium niveum

Scientific classification
- Domain: Eukaryota
- Clade: Sar
- Clade: Alveolata
- Phylum: Ciliophora
- Class: Oligohymenophorea
- Subclass: Peritrichia
- Order: Sessilida; Stein, 1833

Families
- Ellobiophryidae; Epistylididae; Lagenophryidae; Operculariidae; Rovinjellidae; Scyphidiidae; Vaginicolidae; Vorticellidae; Zoothamniidae; Ophrydiidae

= Sessilida =

Order of single-celled organisms

Sessilida is the largest order of the peritrich ciliates.

== List of families ==
- Ellobiophryidae
- Epistylididae
- Lagenophryidae
- Operculariidae
- Rovinjellidae
- Scyphidiidae
- Vaginicolidae
- Vorticellidae
- Zoothamniidae
