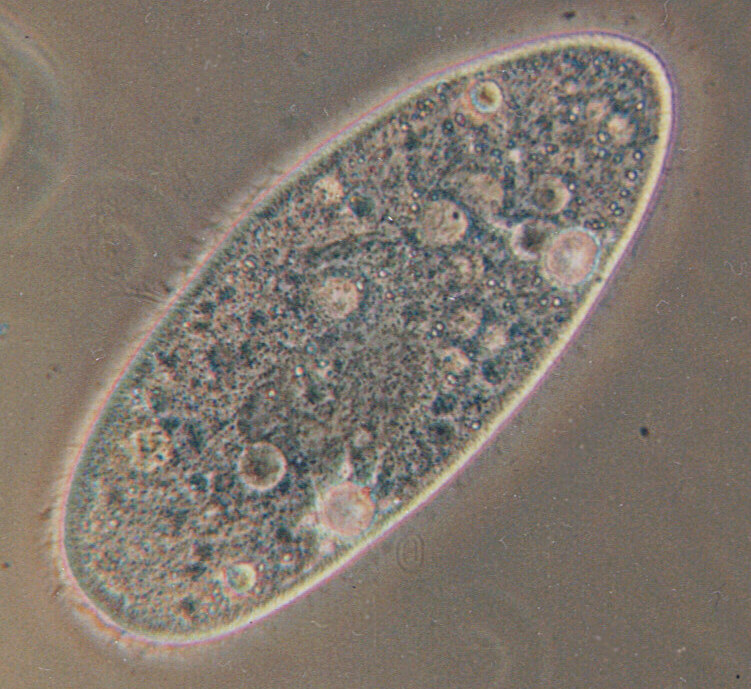
- Paramecium aurelia (Order Peniculida)

Scientific classification
- Domain: Eukaryota
- Clade: Sar
- Clade: Alveolata
- Phylum: Ciliophora
- Subphylum: Intramacronucleata
- Infraphylum: Ventrata
- Class: Oligohymenophorea de Puytorac, Batisse, Bohatier, Corliss, Deroux, Didier, Dragesco, Fryd-Versavel, Grain, Grollere, Horasse, Mode, Laval, Roque, Savoie & Tuffrau, 1974

Subclasses
- Apostomatia; Astomatia; Hymenostomatia; Peniculia; Peritrichia; Scuticociliatia

= Oligohymenophorea =

Class of single-celled organisms

The Oligohymenophorea are a large class of ciliates. There is typically a ventral groove containing the mouth and distinct oral cilia, separate from those of the body. These include a paroral membrane to the right of the mouth and membranelles, usually three in number, to its left. The cytopharynx is inconspicuous and never forms the complex cyrtos found in similar classes. Body cilia generally arise from monokinetids, with dikinetids occurring in limited distribution over part of the body.

== Characteristics ==
In most groups the body cilia are uniform and often dense, while the oral cilia are inconspicuous and sometimes reduced, but among the peritrichs almost the opposite is the case. Members are widely distributed, and include many free-living (typically fresh-water, but many marine) and symbiotic forms. Most are microphagous, grazing on smaller organisms swept into the mouth by the cilia, but various other feeding habits occur. In one group, the astomes, the mouth and associated structures have been lost altogether.

The Oligohymenophorea were first proposed in 1974 as one of three classes of ciliates, together with the Polyhymenophorea or spirotrichs and the now abandoned Kinetofragmophora. Since then the apostomes have been added, but otherwise its composition has remained relatively constant, with the main variations being the positions of the peniculids and plagiopylids.

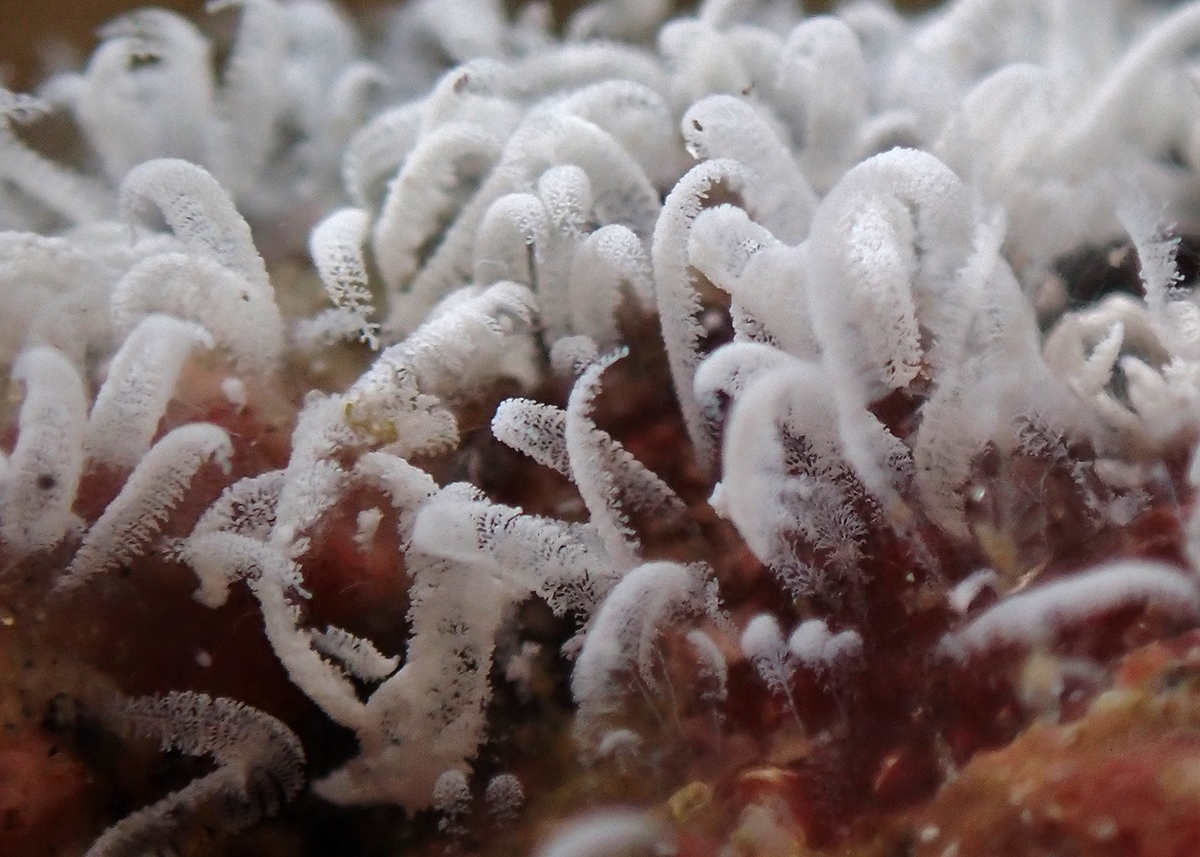
Zoothamnium niveum

== List of orders ==
According to the WoRMS:

- subclass Apostomatia
  - order Apostomatida
  - order Astomatophorida
  - order Pilisuctorida
- subclass Astomatia
  - order Astomatida
- subclass Hymenostomatia
  - order Ophryoglenida
  - order Hymenostomatida
  - order Tetrahymenida
- subclass Peniculia
  - order Peniculida
- subclass Peritrichia
  - order Mobilida
  - order Sessilida
- subclass Scuticociliatia
  - order Philasterida
  - order Pleuronematida
  - order Thigmotrichida
