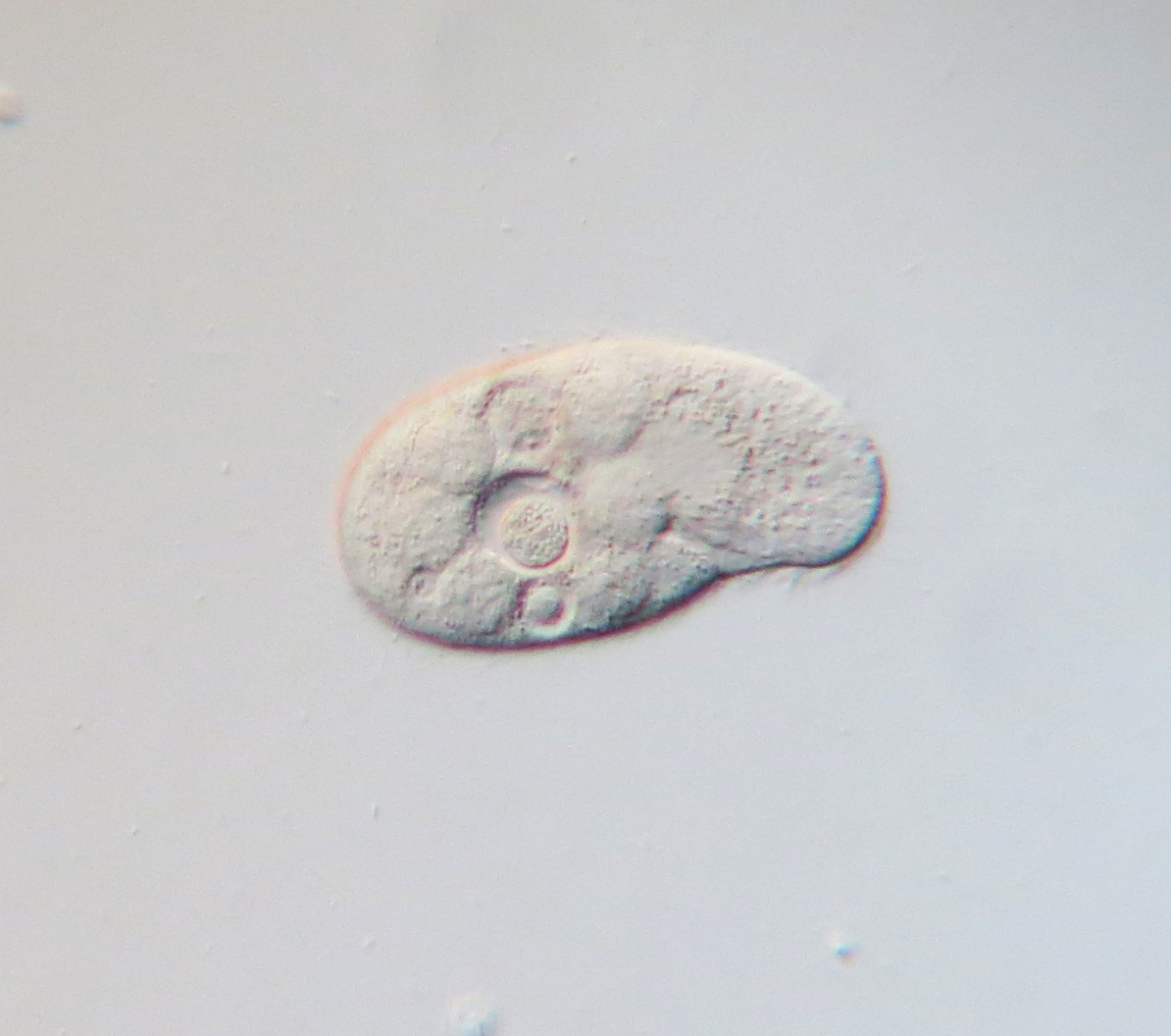
- Colpidium colpoda

Scientific classification
- Domain: Eukaryota
- Clade: Sar
- Superphylum: Alveolata
- Phylum: Ciliophora
- Class: Oligohymenophorea
- Order: Hymenostomatida
- Family: Tetrahymenidae
- Genus: Colpidium
- Species: C. colpoda

Binomial name
- Colpidium colpoda (Losana, 1829) Ganner & Foissner, 1989

= Colpidium colpoda =

Species of protozoan

Colpidium colpoda are free-living ciliates commonly found in many freshwater environments including streams, rivers, lakes and ponds across the world. Colpidium colpoda is also frequently found inhabiting wastewater treatment plants. This species is used as an indicator of water quality and waste treatment plant performance.

== History and physical characteristics ==
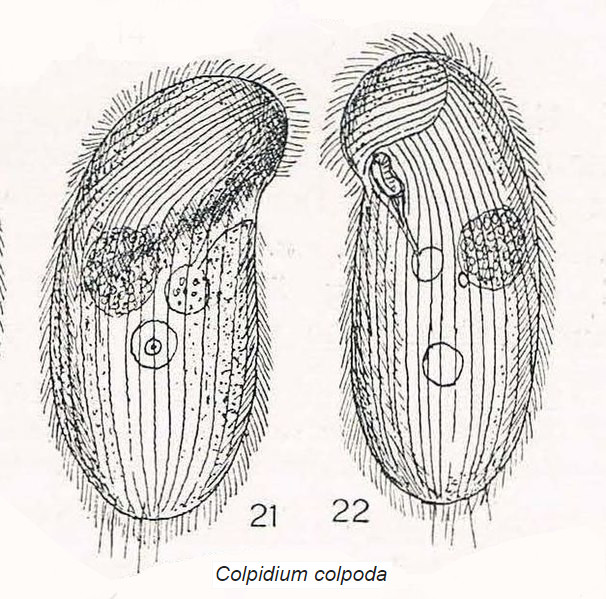
Colpidium colpoda illustration by Alfred Kahl

The first record of Colpidium colpoda was in 1829 by Mathaeo Losana, who placed it in the genus Paramaecia. It was more thoroughly described by Christian Gottfried Ehrenberg in his two volume publication Die Infusionsthierchen als vollkommene Organismen (which roughly translates to “The Infusoria as Perfect Organisms”) in 1838. The species was described in detail by Ganner and Foissner in 1989.

C. colpoda is considered an intermediate sized ciliate, typically between 50 and 150 μm long. The cell is roughly oval or kidney-shaped in profile, with a distinct concavity on the anterior of the oral side. Cilia are arranged in 50-63 longitudinal rows. At the center of the cell is a large, ovoid macronucleus and a small spherical micronucleus. A single contractile vacuole is located slightly posterior to the middle of the body, near the right side.

Like many ciliates, it is a heterotrophic bacterivore that ingests bacteria through an oral groove. C. colpoda reproduces asexually every 4–6 hours, with variation in division rates arising from environmental conditions and the identity of the available bacterial food source.

== Phylogeny ==
In general, it is believed that ciliates form a monophyletic group that diverged from other eukaryotes early in evolutionary history, following the evolution of heterokaryotic genetic systems but prior to the evolution of multicellularity and some organelles such as endoplasmic reticulum and Golgi complex. Colpidium falls within the ciliate taxonomic order Hymenostomatida, which also includes the well-studied Tetrahymena and Glaucoma genera. Previous work suggests that Colpidium seems to be more closely related to Glaucoma than to Tetrahymena. However, more recent analyses have found the opposite – that Colpidium is, in fact, more closely related to Tetrahymena than to Glaucoma.

== Genetics ==
Although a complete genome is not available for Colpidium colpoda, partial sequences have been published for the small subunit 18S rRNA gene and the cytochrome oxidase subunit 1 (cox1) gene and complete sequences for the telomerase RNA gene and the 5.8S rRNA gene. Within the same taxonomic family as C. colpoda is the microbial model organism Tetrahymena thermophila. There is a large body of scientific literature on the T. thermophila genome as a representative of the Alveolates, a major evolutionary branch of eukaryotes that includes all ciliates, dinoflagellates and apicomplexans. Like many ciliates, T. thermophila has a surprisingly complex genome that consists of a germline micronucleus and a somatic macronucleus that function and replicate independently of one another. In 2006, the full genome of the T. thermophila macronucleus was sequenced

== Ecology ==
Because Colpidium colpoda feeds on bacteria, this species is typically found in heavily polluted freshwater habitats. For this reason, presence of C. colpoda is often seen as an indicator of poor water quality. C. colpoda and its congeners are also commonly used in laboratory microcosm experiments. Colpidium colpoda can be used to accelerate the rate of degradation of crude oil during bioremediation, although the exact mechanism behind this relationship is unclear. Speculation points toward secretion of mucus that acts as an emulsifier, mechanical action of cilia contributing to emulsification and reduction of competition between bacteria that contribute to hydrocarbon degradation and those that do not through grazing, amongst other possibilities.
