= Advancing Secondary Science Education through Tetrahymena =

Science education outreach program

Advancing Secondary Science Education through Tetrahymena (ASSET) is a science education programme at Cornell University, New York, that is dedicated to expanding the use of the protist Tetrahymena in K-12 classrooms. It is funded by the National Institutes of Health through the Science Education Partnership Award Program. In addition to secondary education, ASSET has worked to develop materials for students in elementary, middle and high schools. It develops modules, which are stand-alone labs or lessons that can be used in a school's curriculum.

== Modules ==
ASSET has created fifteen science modules, each addressing a topic relevant to life science education in United States school curricula. Modules are designed to be stand-alone lessons that complement a curriculum. ASSET ships the equipment needed to complete the modules to the teacher, who can use them for up to two weeks. Some materials, such as live cells, may be sent separately to enable the culture to be established in the teacher's classroom.

An example of a module is Cannibalism and Interspecific Predation. This utilizes two species, Tetrahymena thermophilia and Tetrahymena vorax. In the lab, an extract, called stomatin, is made from the thermophilia, then placed into the vorax culture. There, it induces a transformation from the microstome form to the macrostome form in T. vorax. This transformation is notable by a marked increase in the size of the cell (doubling or sometimes more), the resorption of the microstomal oral apparatus and the construction of a much larger macrostomal oral apparatus. The transformation allows the macrostomal T. vorax cells to prey on T. thermophilia, but also to cannibalize the microstomes of their own species.

ASSET has also created five science and society modules, designed to integrate social studies and science education into one unit.
