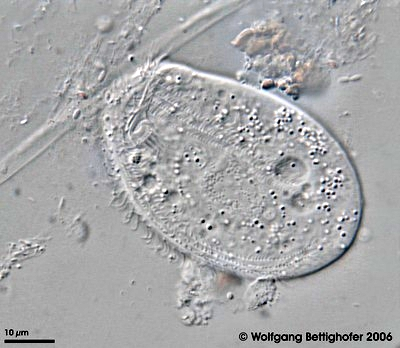

Scientific classification
- Domain: Eukaryota
- Clade: Sar
- Superphylum: Alveolata
- Phylum: Ciliophora
- Class: Phyllopharyngea
- Order: Chlamydodontida
- Family: Chilodonellidae
- Genus: Chilodonella
- Species: C. uncinata

Binomial name
- Chilodonella uncinata (Ehrenberg, 1838)

Synonyms
- Chilodonella algivora; Chilodonella rigida

= Chilodonella uncinata =

Species of single-celled organism

Chilodonella uncinata is a single-celled organism of the ciliate class of alveolates. As a ciliate, C. uncinata has cilia covering its body and a dual nuclear structure, the micronucleus and macronucleus. Unlike some other ciliates, C. uncinata contains millions of minichromosomes (somatic chromosomes) in its macronucleus while its micronucleus is estimated to contain 3 chromosomes. Childonella uncinata is the causative agent of Chilodonelloza, a disease that affects the gills and skin of fresh water fish, and may act as a facultative of mosquito larva.

== Habitat ==
Chilodonella uncinata has a cosmopolitan distribution. It is suspected to act as a facultative endoparasite of the larvae of the Culex, Aedes, and Anopheles mosquito larva. It lives in fresh water ponds, lakes, creeks, and bayous where it feeds on bacteria and other microbes.

Microscopic examination of cytological samples showed that mosquito larva containing subcutaneous encysted C. uncinata had a 25-100% mortality in the mosquito larva, but no viability examinations were conducted.

== Biology and morphology ==
Chilodonella uncinata has a broad thigmotactic zone that is two-thirds the length of the body width and has a pronounced anterior beak that is directed to the left. It can be maintained under laboratory conditions in a cereal wheat grass media inoculated with Klebsiella sp. Optimal growth occurs between 25 and 30 °C. C. uncinata is capable of sporulation and can resist environments with limited resources for a period of time.

== Genome structure ==
All ciliates have two nuclei, but they differ in their structure of the somatic nucleus. All ciliates except Karyorelictea have a dividing macronucleus. C. uncinata also has a dividing macronucleus, but it modifies its macronuclear genome from the maternal micronuclear genome by producing macronuclear chromosomes that contain one or two open reading frame (ORFs). The average size of these macronuclear chromosomes is 4 kbit/s. The macronuclear chromosomes are also amplified to produce a high variable copy number between the chromosomes. For example, chromosome A may have 500 copies while chromosome B only has 5 copies in the macronucleus. This leaves the macronuclear genome with millions of individual chromosomes, all containing telomere ends, only one ORF, and little area for transcription factor binding for initiation of transcription.

=== Internally eliminated sequences ===
Internally eliminated sequences (IES) are noncoding regions of the germ-line genome found in Ciliates. They are defined as sections of DNA removed from the diploid micronuclear genome during which a copy of the micronuclear genome is converted to the macronuclear genome even though errors occur in which an IES sequence may not be deleted. There is little conservation of motifs between Ciliate species; however, C. uncinata, like other ciliate species, show a conserved IES sequence motif within a species. It is unknown if IES sequences have a function in the genome, but in the ciliate Paramecium, an IES sequence is used to determine the mating type of an individual. When a specific IES sequence is not deleted from the developing somatic nucleus, then it is type O mating type. However, if that IES is deleted from the developing macronucleus, it is type E mating type. Paramecium can only mate with individual of opposite mating type.

Unlike Tetrahymena or Paramecium, it has been observed that C. uncinata has a larger number of IES sequences within a single protein-coding gene than in other ciliates . Also there exists populations of C. uncinata that contain an IES sequence that other populations do not carry.

=== Reproduction and division ===
Chilodonella uncinata has sexual conjugation for recombination, and replication of the cell occurs by asexual division

== Sexual conjugation ==
Sex and reproduction are separate in ciliates. C. uncinata is capable of mating with other C. uncinata cells that have the same mating type. After mating type complementary, the germ-line nucleus undergoes meiosis to produce zygotic nuclei. Each conjugated cell transfers one zygotic nucleus to the other cell where the zygotic nuclei fuse. The diploid germ-line nucleus undergoes mitosis which creates a duplicated germ-line nucleus. At this point the somatic nucleus is being degraded.

The duplicated germ-line nucleus then develops into the new somatic nucleus. The genomic structure of the somatic nucleus is being created by chromosomal fragmentation with single-gene chromosomes and amplification of these somatic chromosomes. It is unknown what determines the copy number of each chromosome or if the copy number of the somatic chromosomes are heritable between sexual conjugations.

== Asexual reproduction ==
C. uncinata goes through asexual reproduction for cell division and duplication called amitosis. As C. uncinata has two nuclei, it goes through two different styles of division of the nuclei. The germ-line nucleus goes through mitosis during asexual division while the somatic nucleus undergoes amitosis. Amitosis is a stochastic process where unlike in mitosis, there is no spindle formation to segregate chromosomes during nuclear division. Instead, the chromosomes within the somatic nucleus are duplicated, and the nucleus goes through binary division. The precise mechanism is unknown, but it is believed that somatic chromosomes that are located on one side of the dividing somatic nucleus are distributed to one daughter cell, and the somatic chromosomes on the other side of the nucleus are distributed to the other daughter cell.

This amitotic process causes the two daughter cells to potentially have identical germ-line nucleus but a different somatic nucleus in regards to the copy numbers of the chromosomes. As the somatic nucleus is the nucleus that is transcriptionally active, this somatic copy number mutation derived by the amitotic process could have fitness consequences for the individual cell.

=== Use in genomic research ===
Childonella uncinata is easily cultured in the laboratory, has a fast generation time, and has a complex genomic structure that allows C. uncinata to be a model organism for genomic architecture, genomic networks, and genome evolution research. Specifically, C. uncinata along with other closely related Ciliates has been used to determine the evolution of duplication of the alpha-tubulin gene. It was found that C. uncinata contains two paralogs of alpha-tubulin where the variation between the paralogs is highly concentrated within three small areas of the gene.
