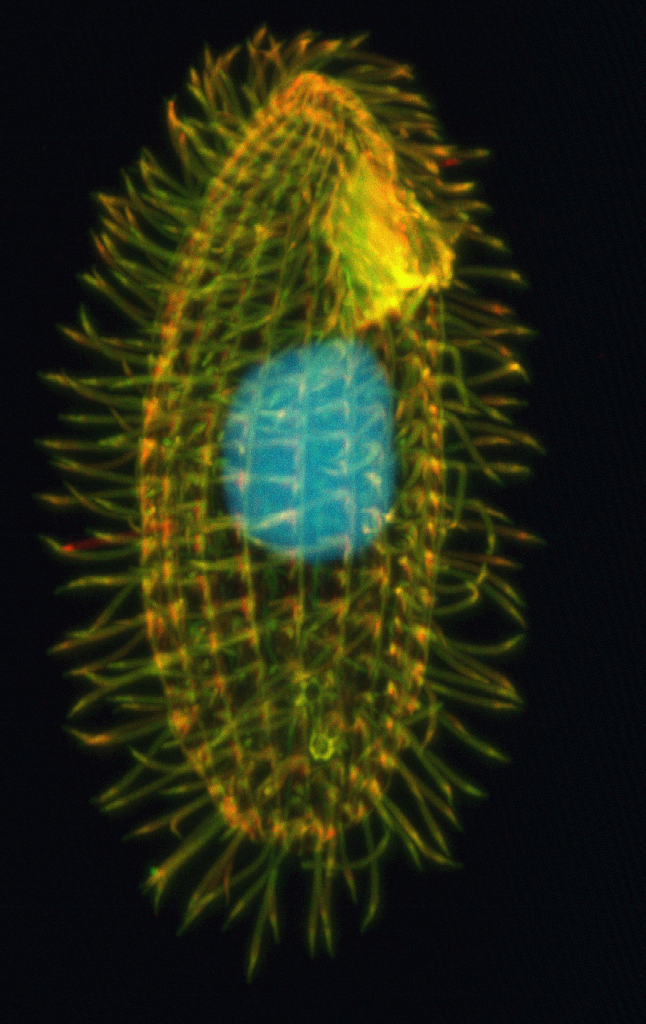

Scientific classification
- Domain: Eukaryota
- Supergroup: Alveolata
- Phylum: Ciliophora
- Class: Oligohymenophorea
- Order: Hymenostomatida
- Family: Tetrahymenidae
- Genus: Tetrahymena
- Species: T. thermophila

Binomial name
- Tetrahymena thermophila Nanney & McCoy, 1976

= Tetrahymena thermophila =

Species of ciliate protozoa

Tetrahymena thermophila is a species of Ciliophora in the family Tetrahymenidae. It is a free living protozoon and occurs in fresh water.

There is little information on the ecology and natural history of this species, but it is the most widely known and studied species in the genus Tetrahymena. The species has been used as a model organism for molecular and cellular biology. It has also helped in the discovery of new genes as well as helping to understand the mechanisms of function of certain genes. Studies on this species have contributed to major discoveries in biology.

For example, the MAT locus found in this species has provided a foundation for the evolution of mating systems.

The species was at first considered to be a form of Tetrahymena pyriformis. T. malaccensis is the closest relative toT. thermophila.

== Characteristics ==
It is about 50 μm long. One famous trait this species is known for is that has 7 different mating types, unlike most eukaryotic organisms, which usually only have 2.

== Taxonomy ==
T. thermophila along with other Tetrahymena species were originally lumped together as a single species called Tetrahymena pyriformis. With T. thermophila first being called T. pyriformis variety 1 and then T. pyriformis syngen 1. It was later renamed to T. thermophila in 1974.

== Genetics ==
Tetrahymena thermophila has about 200 million nucleotides and 27 thousand genes in its nuclear genome.

It also exhibits nuclear dimorphism: two types of cell nuclei. They have a bigger, non-germline macronucleus and a small, germline micronucleus in each cell at the same time and these two carry out different functions with distinct cytological and biological properties. This unique versatility has allowed scientists to use Tetrahymena to identify several key factors regarding gene expression and genome integrity. In addition, Tetrahymena possess hundreds of cilia and has complicated microtubule structures, making it an optimal model to illustrate the diversity and functions of microtubule arrays.

=== DNA repair ===
When T. thermophila is exposed to UV light it results in a greater than 100-fold increase in the expression of the gene for the DNA repair enzyme Rad51. Treatment with the DNA alkylating agent methyl methanesulfonate also resulted in substantially elevated Rad 51 protein levels. These findings suggest that ciliates such as T. thermophila utilize a Rad51-dependent recombinational pathway to repair damaged DNA.

The Rad51 recombinase of T. thermophila is a homolog of the Escherichia coli RecA recombinase. In T. thermophila, Rad51 participates in homologous recombination during mitosis, meiosis and in the repair of double-strand breaks. During conjugation, Rad51 is necessary for completion of meiosis. Meiosis in T. thermophila appears to employ a Mus81-dependent pathway that does not use a synaptonemal complex and is considered secondary in most other model eukaryotes. This pathway includes the Mus81 resolvase and the Sgs1 helicase. The Sgs1 helicase appears to promote the non-crossover outcome of meiotic recombinational repair of DNA, a pathway that generates little genetic variation.

== Reproduction ==
The species reproduces by asexual fission but it also engages in "conjugation", in which two cells come together and exchange gametes. Conjugation results in zygotes (one in each cell), and the zygotes go on to develop into the two separate nuclei of each cell, while the old nuclei are destroyed. In nature the species is an outbreeder.

Tetrahymena thermophila has 7 mating types determined by a single locus with various alleles. The mating types are named I, II, III, IV, V, VI and VII.

The mating types can reproduce in 21 different combinations, and a Tetrahymena cannot mate with its own type. Each organism "decides" which sex it will become during mating, through a stochastic process.

== Occurrence ==
The species lives in freshwater. It usually lives in streams, ponds, and lakes.

The phylogeography of the species is fairly unexplored; it has been observed along the eastern coast of the United States, but it has not been observed in other continents with it currently only being reported in North America. However, it has been said to have an occurrence across the world.

== History ==
Since the 1930s it has been known that the species has 7 mating types.

Immobilized antigens were found in this species were first explored by workers in Ray Owen's lab.

In 1953, the MAT locus in this species was first described by David L. Nanney.

In 1982, the group 1 intron was discovered located in the rRNA transcript of this species by Thomas Cech and his coworkers. This was considered the first ribozyme, a piece of RNA that can catalyze a reaction, in this case self-splice from a primary transcript without the help of proteins. Cech later also discovered enzymatic RNA in this species.

The cryo-EM structure of telomerase was first reported in T. thermophila, to be followed a few years later by the cryo-EM structure of telomerase in humans.

The first report of Histone acetyltransferase (HAT) activity was reported in this species in the year 1995. The first type A HAT was discovered in this species.
