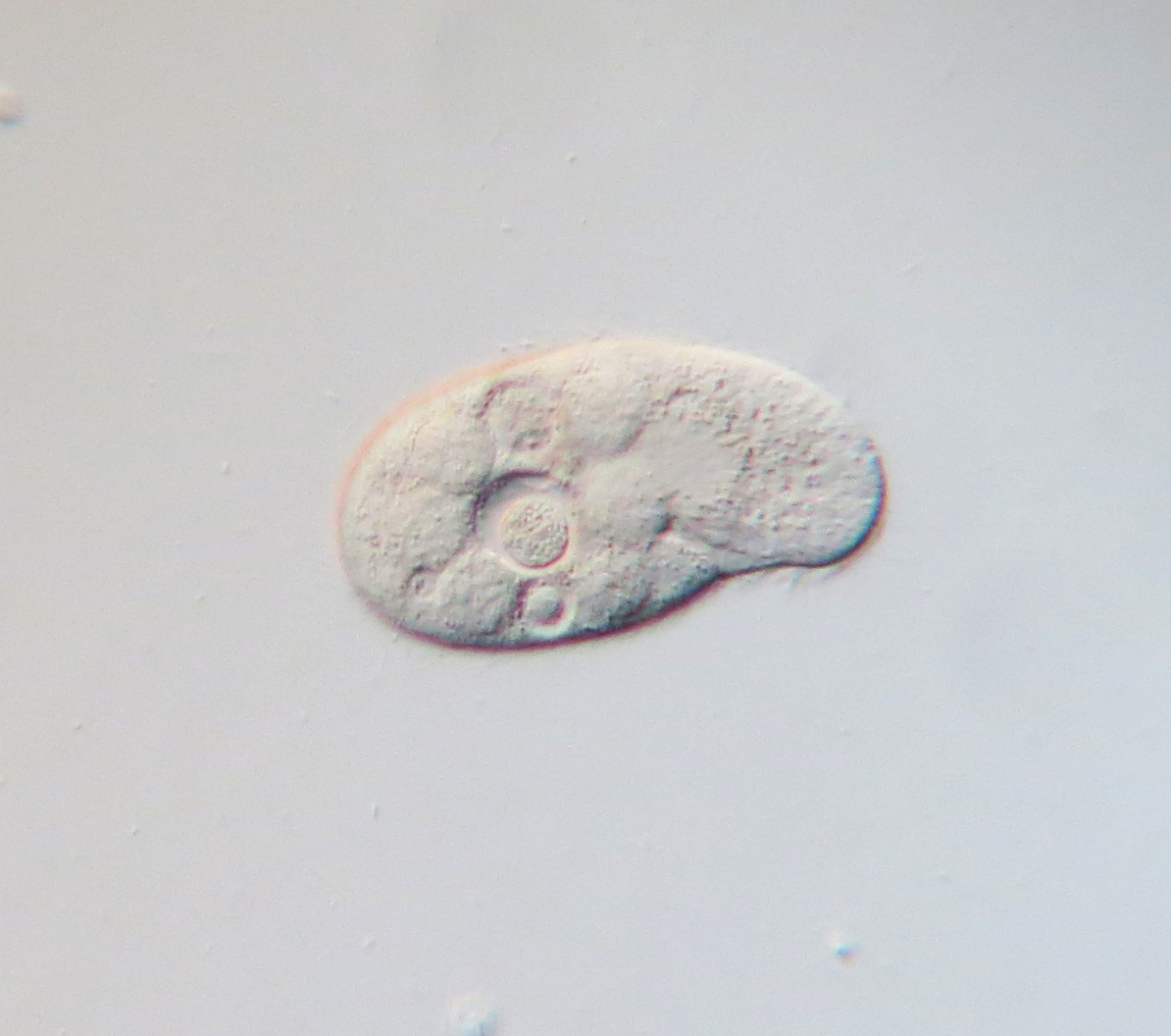
- Colpidium colpoda

Scientific classification
- Domain: Eukaryota
- Clade: Diaphoretickes
- Clade: SAR
- Clade: Alveolata
- Phylum: Ciliophora
- Class: Oligohymenophorea
- Order: Hymenostomatida
- Family: Tetrahymenidae
- Genus: Colpidium

Species
- Colpidium campylum Stokes; Colpidium colpoda (Ehr.)

= Colpidium =

Genus of protozoan

Colpidium is a genus of ciliates.
