= Citrullinase =

Class of enzymes

Identifiers
- EC no.: 3.5.1.20
- CAS no.: 59088-17-4

Databases
- BRENDA: enzyme data
- ExPASy: NiceZyme view
- KEGG: enzyme entry
- MetaCyc: metabolic pathway
- Rhea: reactions
- PDB structures: RCSB PDB PDBe PDBsum
- Gene Ontology: AmiGO / QuickGO
Search
- PMC: articles
- PubMed: articles
- NCBI: proteins

Citrullinase (EC 3.5.1.20) is an enzyme that catalyzes the chemical reaction

citrulline
H_{2}O
NH_{3}
ornithine
+ CO_{2}

The enzyme characterised from Tetrahymena pyriformis hydrolyses citrulline to the amino acid, ornithine, with ammonia and carbon dioxide as byproducts.

This enzyme is a hydrolase, one acting on carbon-nitrogen bonds other than peptide bonds, specifically in linear amides. The systematic name of this enzyme class is L-citrulline N5-carbamoyldihydrolase. Other names in use include citrulline ureidase, citrulline hydrolase, and L-citrulline 5-N-carbamoyldihydrolase.
