= Epigenetic controls in ciliates =

Epigenetic controls in ciliates is about the unique characteristic of Ciliates, which is that they possess two kinds of nuclei (this phenomenon is called nuclear dimorphism): a micronucleus used for inheritance, and a macronucleus, which controls the metabolism. The micronucleus contains the entirety of the genome whereas the macronucleus only contains the DNA necessary for vegetative growth. The macronucleus divides via amitosis, whereas the micronucleus undergoes typical mitosis. During sexual development a new macronucleus is formed from the meiosis of the micronucleus, where the removal of transposons occurs. On the division or reproduction of ciliates, the two nuclei are under several epigenetic controls.
