= Mary Stuart MacDougall =

American biologist

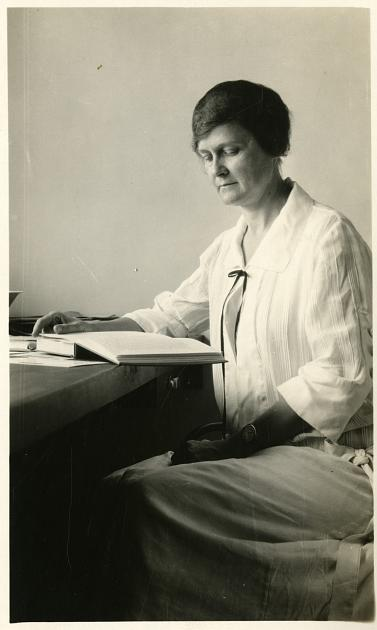
- Born: November 7, 1885
- Died: 1972
- Occupation: Biologist

Mary Stuart MacDougall (7 November 1885—1972) was an American biologist who studied protozoology. She wrote Biology: The Science of Life.

== Education and career ==
MacDougall received her Bachelor of Arts from Randolph–Macon College in 1912 before proceeding to get her Master of Science from the University of Chicago and finally, her Ph.D. from Columbia University, in 1925. In 1920, MacDougall would become the head of the biology department at Agnes Scott College. She worked at Agnes Scott until 1952, when she retired. Every summer, for fourteen years, MacDougall was an instructor and researcher at the Marine Biological Laboratory.

While at Agnes Scott, MacDougall studied protozoology and cytology. She studied the polyploid and diploid of Chilodonella uncinata, as well as mutation inheritances found in them. MacDougall also researched the chromosomes of plasmodium, avian malaria and neuromotors of chlamydodon.

== Notable awards ==
- Guggenheim Memorial Fellowship, 1931

== Publications ==
- MacDougall, Mary Stuart. "Another mutation of Chilodon uncinatus produced by ultraviolet radiation, with a description of its maturation processes." Journal of Experimental Biology.. 1931: 58.1 (p. 229-236)
- MacDougall, Mary Stuart. Biology: The Science of Life. New York: McGraw-Hill (1943).
- MacDougall, Mary Stuart. "Cytological Observations on Gymnostomatous Ciliates, with a Description of the Maturation Phenomena in Diploid and Tetraploid Forms of Chilodon uncinatus." Quarterly Journal of Microscopical Science. 1925: 69.3.
- MacDougall, Mary Stuart. "The neuromotor apparatus of chlamydodon sp." Biological Bulletin. 1928: 54.6 (p. 471-484).
- MacDougall, Mary Stuart. Study of a Georgia hillside. Chicago: University of Chicago (1916).
