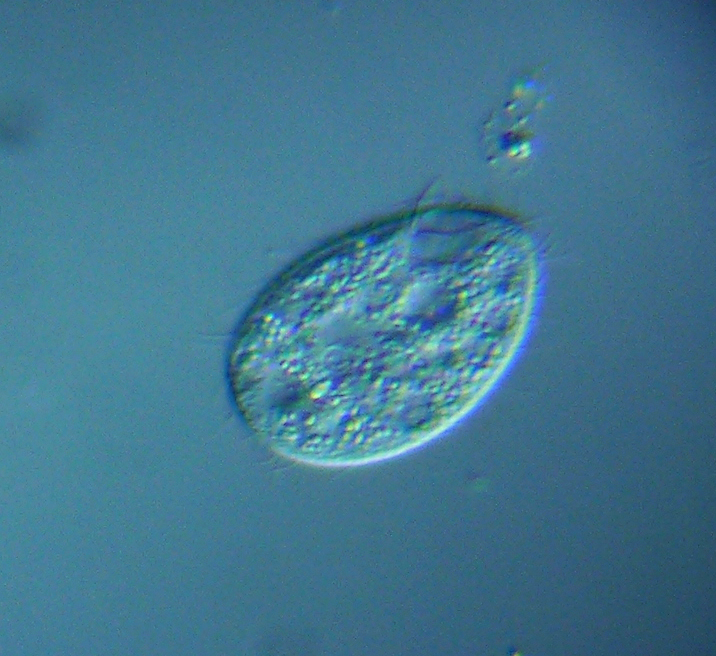

Scientific classification
- Domain: Eukaryota
- Clade: Sar
- Superphylum: Alveolata
- Phylum: Ciliophora
- Class: Oligohymenophorea
- Order: Hymenostomatida
- Family: Tetrahymenidae
- Genus: Tetrahymena
- Species: T. pyriformis

Binomial name
- Tetrahymena pyriformis (Ehrenberg, 1830) Furgason, 1940

Synonyms
- Colpoda pirum Müller, 1786; Kolpoda pirum Müller, 1786; Leucophrys pyriformis Ehrenberg, 1830; Saprophilus oviformis Kahl, 1926; Sathrophilus oviformis; Tetrahymena geleii Furgason, 1940; Tetrahymena pyriformis-komplex; Trichoda pyrum Ehrenberg, 1830

= Tetrahymena pyriformis =

Species of ciliate protozoa

Tetrahymena pyriformis is a species of Ciliophora in the family Tetrahymenidae.

Of protozoan species, it is one of the most commonly used as a laboratory model for toxicological research.

The species is widely distributed. It lives in fresh water like springs, ditches, creeks, ponds, and lakes.
