= Edgard Hérouard =

French marine biologist (1858-1932)

Edgard Joseph Émile Hérouard
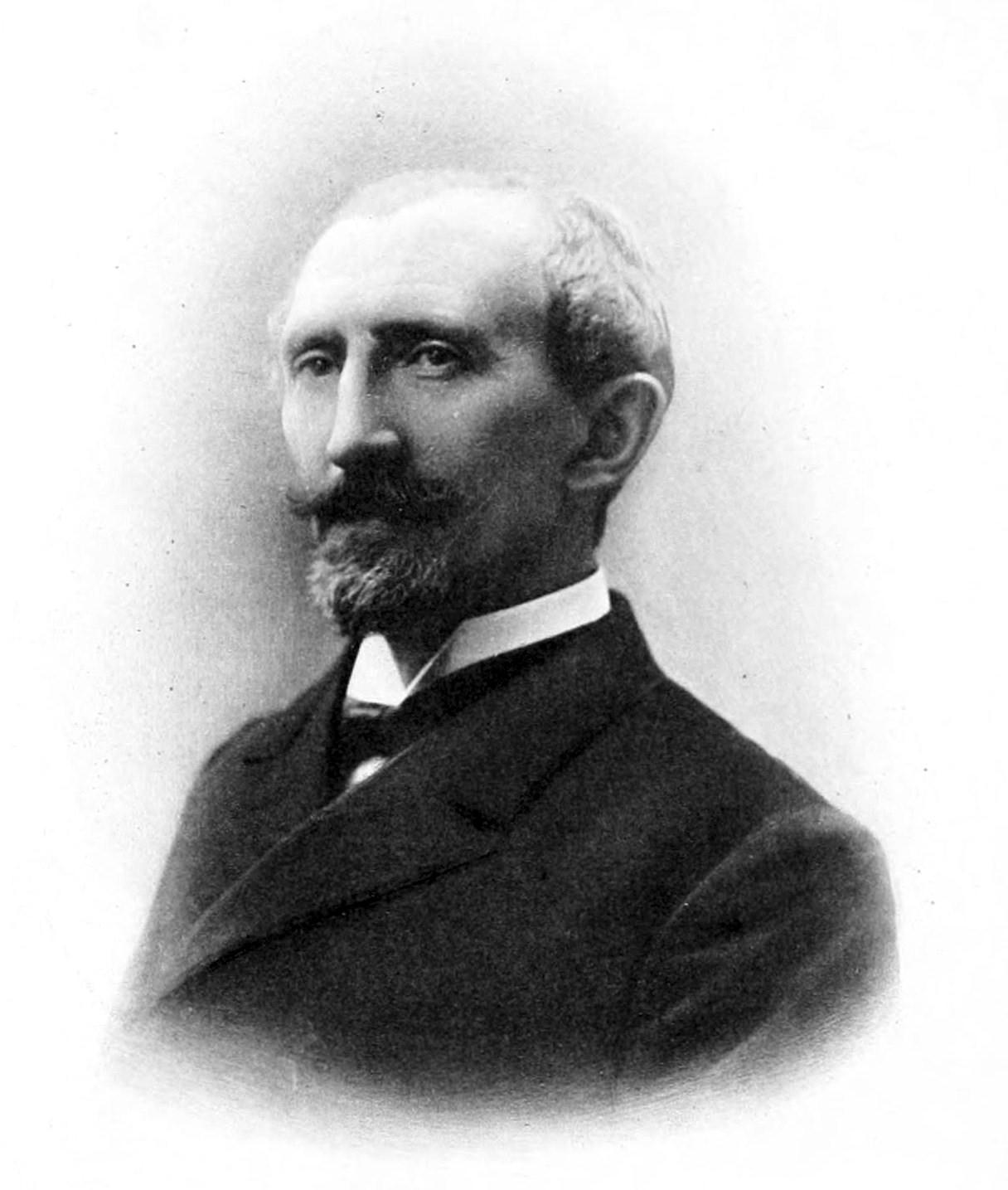
- Born: 18 March 1858
- Died: 22 March 1932 (aged 74); Paris, France
- Scientific career
- Fields: Marine biology

Edgard Joseph Émile Hérouard (18 March 1858 in Saint-Quentin, Aisne - 22 March 1932 in Paris) was a French marine biologist.

In 1889 he started work as a préparateur at the Sorbonne, earning his doctorate in natural sciences during the following year. From 1895 he served as chef des travaux pratiques de zoologie. In 1901 he was named vice-president of the Société zoologique de France, and soon afterwards was appointed assistant director of the Station biologique de Roscoff. In 1910 he attained the title of associate professor, becoming a professor "without chair" in 1921.

Hérouard is known for his investigations of sea cucumbers, providing descriptions of numerous Holothurian species. Also, with Yves Delage (1854-1920), he is credited with describing the Order Hymenostomatida (1896).

== Selected writings ==
- Recherches sur les holothuries des côtes de France, 1889
- De l'excrétion chez les Holothuries, 1895
- Traite de zoologie concréte (with Yves Delage), 1896; several volumes.
- Holothuries provenant des campagnes de la Princesse-Alice (1892-1897), 1902
- Holothuries, 1906
- Sur les molpadides de Norvége, 1910.
