= Nuclear dimorphism =

Nuclear dimorphism is a term referred to the special characteristic of having two different kinds of nuclei in a cell. There are many differences between the types of nuclei. This feature is observed in protozoan ciliates, like Tetrahymena, and some foraminifera. Ciliates contain two nucleus types: a macronucleus that is primarily used to control metabolism, and a micronucleus which performs reproductive functions and generates the macronucleus. The compositions of the nuclear pore complexes help determine the properties of the macronucleus and micronucleus. Nuclear dimorphism is subject to complex epigenetic controls. Nuclear dimorphism is continuously being studied to understand exactly how the mechanism works and how it is beneficial to cells. Learning about nuclear dimorphism is beneficial to understanding old eukaryotic mechanisms that have been preserved within these unicellular organisms but did not evolve into multicellular eukaryotes.

Ciliates are unicellular eukaryotes that display nuclear dimorphism involving a macronucleus and a micronucleus.

== Key components ==
The ciliated protozoan Tetrahymena is a useful research model for studying nuclear dimorphism; it maintains two distinct nuclear genomes, the micronucleus and the macronucleus. The macronucleus and micronucleus are located in the same cytoplasm, however, they are very different. The micronucleus genome contains five chromosomes that undergo mitosis during micronuclear division and meiosis during conjugation, which is the sexual division of the micronucleus. The macronuclear genome is broken down and catabolized once per life cycle during conjugation, allowing it to be site-specific, and a new macronucleus differentiates from a mitotic descendant of the conjugated micronucleus. The differences in division and overall processes show how functionally and structurally different the molecules are. These differences play an active role in the activities and functions of the cells in which they are located.

=== Macro vs. micronuclei ===
Macronuclei and micronuclei differ in their functions even though they are located within the same cell. The micronucleus is globally repressed during the vegetative state, and serves as the diploid germline nucleus, whereas all known vegetative gene expression happens in the macronucleus, which is a polyploid somatic nucleus. The micronucleus divides before micronucleus in the state of vegetative growth. The macronucleus is active in transcription. It also aids in the activity and control of the cytoplasm along with the nuclear events that happen within the cell. The micronucleus has chromatin that is densely packed as well as an absence of nucleoli. The micronucleus forms zygotic nuclei during meiosis during conjugation. These zygotic nuclei can follow a process and differentiate into macronucleus or micronucleus cells. Macronucleus cells, on the other hand, differentiate by changes to the DNA. This leads to macronucleus cells being huge compared to micronucleus cells, hence their naming of macro and micro.

=== Role of nuclear pore complex ===
Recent research has shown that the nuclear pore complexes in a binucleated ciliate may be distinct in their composition. This leads to the differences seen in the micronucleus and macronucleus. The nuclear pore complex is made up of nucleoporins, which are proteins. These nucleoporins, Nups, are specific for each type of nucleus. This leads to the structural differences seen between the two types. Since both nuclei are made of the same components, different amounts of the components are added in order to provide the structural differences that are necessary to the functions. The nuclear pore complex is involved with how molecules move across the nuclear envelope when trying to reach the nucleus or the cytoplasm in a process called nucleocytoplasmic trafficking. nuclear pore complexes have been found to be important in transport to the macronucleus and micronucleus since there are different processes happening in two very different nuclei at different times. These differences in the transport apparatuses between the two nuclei lead to the vast differences between micronucleus and macronucleus.

== Research ==
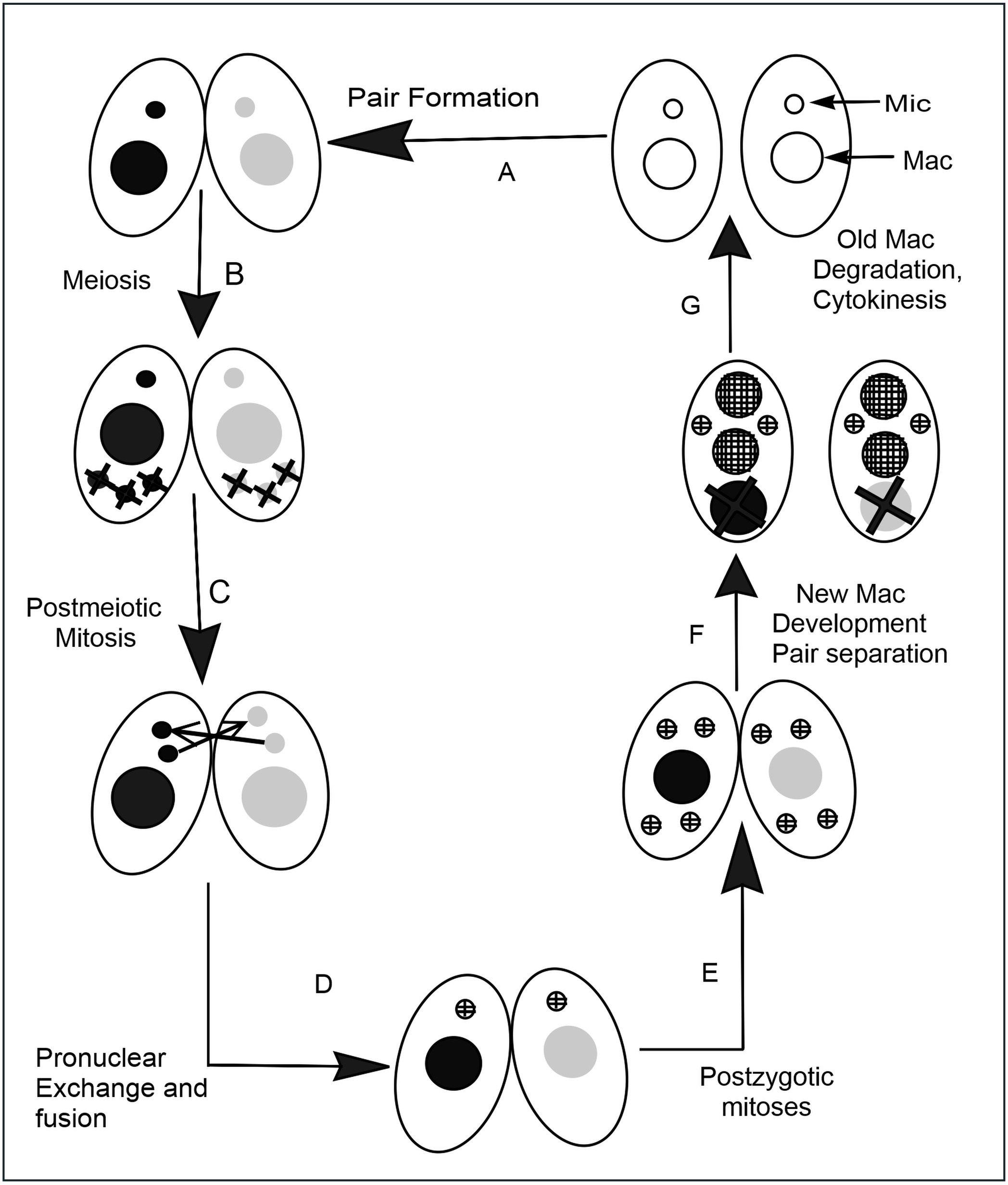
Tetrahymena provide an example of a cell that displays nuclear dimorphism. It includes a micronucleus and macronucleus, and it has been very helpful in various research.

As previously mentioned, research has been done involving Tetrahymena, a unicellular eukaryote. This eukaryote has very interesting mechanisms that impact their function. Research has been done to investigate these mechanisms has led to new discoveries of properties of this eukaryote and general properties of nuclear dimorphism.

Tetrahymena have two major parts of their life cycle. there is an asexual reproduction stage involving binary fission as well as a non-reproductive sexual stage called conjugation. During this conjugation stage, the micronucleus cell undergoes meiosis. During binary fission, the macronucleus divides amitotically, and the micronucleus cell divides mitotically. These differences play a role in the differences between macronucleus and micronucleus cells as well as provide difference between their vegetative genomes. During conjugation, some nuclei are selected. These nuclei are destroyed via a mechanism called programmed nuclear death. Since conjugation is different for both steps, this leads to differences in micronucleus and macronucleus towards the end of conjugation. The changes remain throughout the cycle.

There are other unique biological and biochemical differences between micronucleus and macronucleus. There are three ways in which genetic information is distributed during nuclear division. These include meiosis in micronucleus cells, amitosis in micronucleus cells, and mitosis in micronucleus cells. Micronucleus cell meiosis involves stretching the genome outside the cell while macronucleus cell amitosis involves a random distribution of the genome.

=== Recent ===
Recent research has focused on the causes for the differences between the micronucleus and the macronucleus. Functional differences between micronucleus and macronucleus have been attributed to the selectivity of the transport across the nuclear membrane for some time, and it continues to be a topic of interest for research along with other continuing research. Which molecules can pass through depends on the nuclear pores of macronucleus and micronucleus. Macronucleus pores allow bigger molecules to enter compared to micronucleus pores. This difference is thought to be attributed to the makeup of proteins and nuclear pore complex arrangement between the two nuclei types.

Another recently experimentally tested difference between micronucleus and macronucleus is the specificity that comes from the specific proteins in each. The different nucleoporins in each contributes to structural differences between the two nuclei which in turn, causes functional differences.

Tetrahymena continue to be explored and researched in order to understand how they work and how they manage their complex biological processes. Ciliates and eukaryotes similar to them helps explain old eukaryotic mechanisms that were conserved with them. Since unicellular ciliates represent the last common ancestor of the eukaryotes, it also helps to explain the mechanisms and peaks an interest in why these mechanisms were preserved then disappeared through evolution. While much has been researched and discovered about nuclear dimorphism, there is still room for more research to enhance the current knowledge by enhancing previous studies.

== See also ==
- Epigenetic controls in ciliates
