= Stomatin =

Mammalian protein found in Homo sapiens

STOM

Identifiers
- Aliases: STOM, BND7, EPB7, EPB72, stomatin
- External IDs: OMIM: 133090; MGI: 95403; GeneCards: STOM
Available structures
PDB	Ortholog search: PDBe RCSB
PDB	List of PDB id codes 4FVF, 4FVG, 4FVJ

Gene location (Human)
Chr.	Chromosome 9 (human)
Band	9q33.2	Start	121,338,987 bp
Band	9q33.2	End	121,370,304 bp

Gene location (Mouse)
Chr.	Chromosome 2 (mouse)
Band	2 B|2 23.53 cM	Start	35,203,998 bp
Band	2 B|2 23.53 cM	End	35,226,988 bp
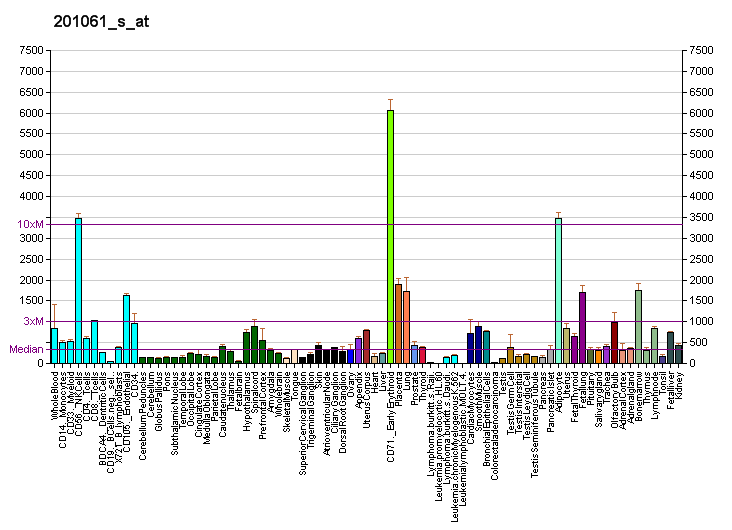

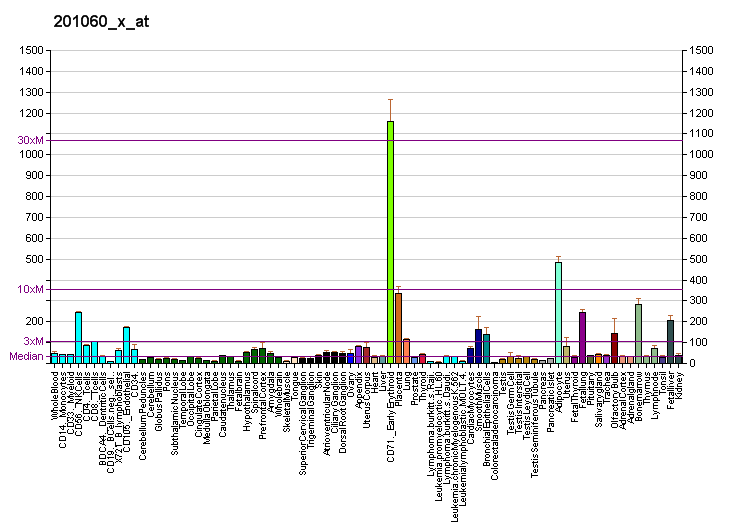
RNA expression pattern
Bgee	Human / Mouse (ortholog); Top expressed in: visceral pleura; pericardium; vena cava; trabecular bone; saphenous vein; right lung; palpebral conjunctiva; lower lobe of lung; parietal pleura; epithelium of colon / Top expressed in: olfactory epithelium; spermatocyte; fetal liver hematopoietic progenitor cell; blood; tibiofemoral joint; secondary oocyte; zygote; brown adipose tissue; right ventricle; ankle; More reference expression data
BioGPS	More reference expression data
Gene ontology
Molecular function	protein homodimerization activity; protein binding; RNA polymerase binding; identical protein binding
Cellular component	vesicle; blood microparticle; membrane; melanosome; integral component of plasma membrane; endoplasmic reticulum; mitochondrion; perinuclear region of cytoplasm; membrane raft; extracellular exosome; cytoskeleton; cytoplasmic vesicle; extracellular space; cytoplasm; cytosol; plasma membrane; azurophil granule membrane; specific granule membrane; tertiary granule membrane; integral component of membrane
Biological process	regulation of ion transmembrane transport; positive regulation by host of viral genome replication; regulation of acid-sensing ion channel activity; protein homooligomerization; positive regulation of viral process; positive regulation of protein targeting to membrane; neutrophil degranulation
Sources:Amigo / QuickGO
Orthologs
Databases	NCBI: entry; OMA: entry
Species	Human	Mouse
Entrez	2040	13830
Ensembl	ENSG00000148175	ENSMUSG00000026880
UniProt	P27105	P54116
RefSeq (mRNA)	NM_001270526; NM_001270527; NM_004099; NM_198194	NM_013515
RefSeq (protein)	NP_001257455; NP_001257456; NP_004090; NP_937837; NP_004090.4	NP_038543
Location (UCSC)	Chr 9: 121.34 – 121.37 Mb	Chr 2: 35.2 – 35.23 Mb
PubMed search
- Wikidata
View/Edit Human	View/Edit Mouse

Stomatin also known as human erythrocyte integral membrane protein band 7 is a protein that in humans is encoded by the STOM gene.

== Clinical significance ==
Stomatin is a 31 kDa integral membrane protein, named after the rare human haemolytic anaemia hereditary stomatocytosis. This gene encodes a member of a highly conserved family of integral membrane proteins. The encoded protein localizes to the cell membrane of red blood cells and other cell types, where it may regulate ion channels and transporters. Loss of localization of the encoded protein is associated with hereditary stomatocytosis, a form of hemolytic anemia.

== Function ==
This gene encodes a member of a highly conserved family of integral membrane proteins. The encoded protein localizes to the cell membrane of red blood cells and other cell types, where it may regulate ion channels and transporters. Loss of localization of the encoded protein is associated with hereditary stomatocytosis, a form of hemolytic anemia.

Although the wide distribution of stomatin and its constitutive expression suggest an important role for this protein in cell biology, perhaps as a “house-keeping” component, its function remains undetermined. The massive presence of stomatin in membrane-protruding folds and extensions suggests a possible structural role for this protein in the formation of these structures and/or the anchorage to the actin cytoskeleton.
