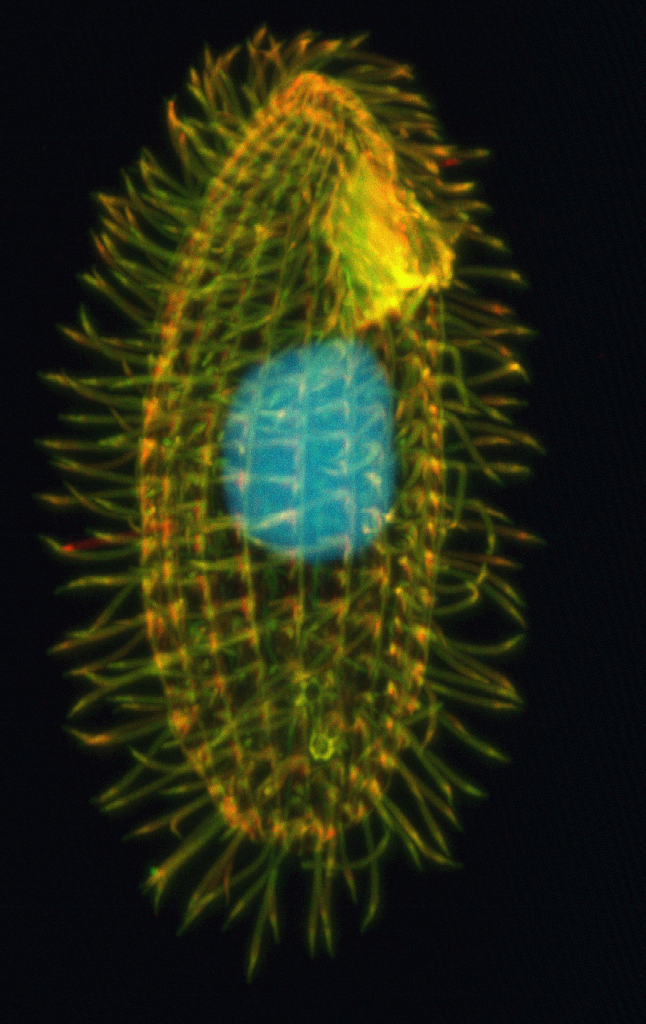
- Tetrahymena thermophila

Scientific classification
- Domain: Eukaryota
- Supergroup: Alveolata
- Phylum: Ciliophora
- Class: Oligohymenophorea
- Order: Hymenostomatida
- Family: Tetrahymenidae
- Genus: Tetrahymena

= Tetrahymena =

Genus of single-celled organisms

Tetrahymena is a genus of free-living ciliates, examples of unicellular eukaryotes. The genus Tetrahymena is the most widely studied member of its phylum. It can produce, store and react with different types of hormones. Tetrahymena cells can recognize both related and hostile cells.

Tetrahymena are commonly endosymbiont hosts to green algae, from which it receives oxygen, helping the host organism survive in anoxic environments. They are common in freshwater lakes, ponds, and streams.

Tetrahymena species used as model organisms in biomedical research are T. thermophila and T. pyriformis. Their main claim to fame is their role in the discovery of telomeres and telomerase which is based on the fact that ciliates are one of the richest sources for these molecules.

== T. thermophila: a model organism in experimental biology ==
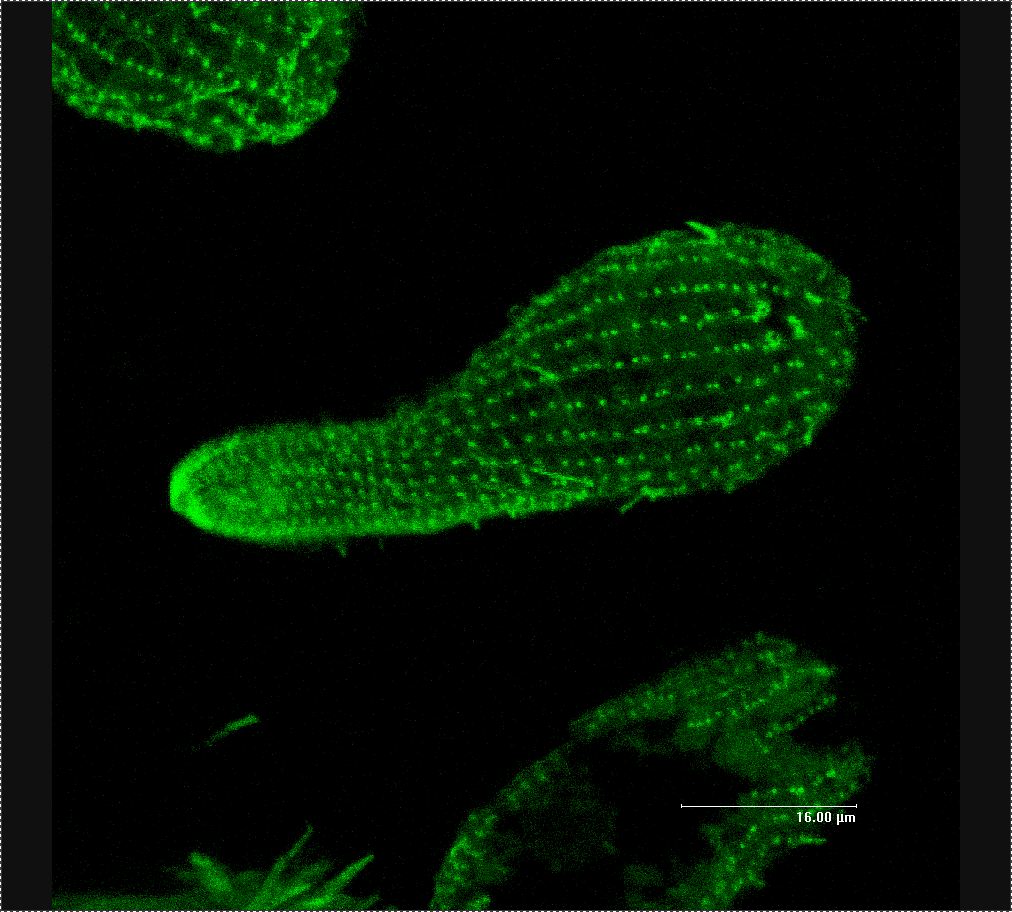
β-tubulin in Tetrahymena.

As a ciliated protozoan, Tetrahymena thermophila exhibits nuclear dimorphism: two types of cell nuclei. They have a bigger, non-germline macronucleus and a small, germline micronucleus in each cell at the same time and these two carry out different functions with distinct cytological and biological properties. This unique versatility allows scientists to use Tetrahymena to identify several key factors regarding gene expression and genome integrity. In addition, Tetrahymena possess hundreds of cilia and has complicated microtubule structures, making it an optimal model to illustrate the diversity and functions of microtubule arrays.

Because Tetrahymena can be grown in a large quantity in the laboratory, it has been a source for biochemical analysis, specifically for enzymatic activities and purification of sub-cellular components. In addition, with the advancement of genetic techniques it has become a model to study the gene function in vivo. The recent sequencing of the macronucleus genome should allow Tetrahymena to continue to be used as a model system.

Tetrahymena thermophila exists in seven different sexes (mating types) that can reproduce in 21 different combinations, and a single tetrahymena cannot reproduce sexually with itself. Each organism "decides" which sex it will become during mating, through a stochastic process.

Studies on Tetrahymena have contributed to several scientific milestones including:

1. First cell which showed synchronized division, which led to the first insights into the existence of mechanisms which control the cell cycle.
2. Identification and purification of the first cytoskeleton based motor protein such as dynein.
3. Aid in the discovery of lysosomes and peroxisomes.
4. Early molecular identification of somatic genome rearrangement.
5. Discovery of the molecular structure of telomeres, telomerase enzyme, the templating role of telomerase RNA and their roles in cellular senescence and chromosome healing (for which a Nobel Prize was won).
6. Nobel Prize–winning co-discovery (1989, in Chemistry) of catalytic RNA (ribozyme).
7. Discovery of the function of histone acetylation.
8. Demonstration of the roles of posttranslational modification such as acetylation and glycylation on tubulins and discovery of the enzymes responsible for some of these modifications (glutamylation)
9. Crystal structure of 40S ribosome in complex with its initiation factor eIF1
10. First demonstration that two of the "universal" stop codons, UAA and UAG, code for the amino acid glutamine in some eukaryotes, leaving UGA as the only termination codon in these organisms.

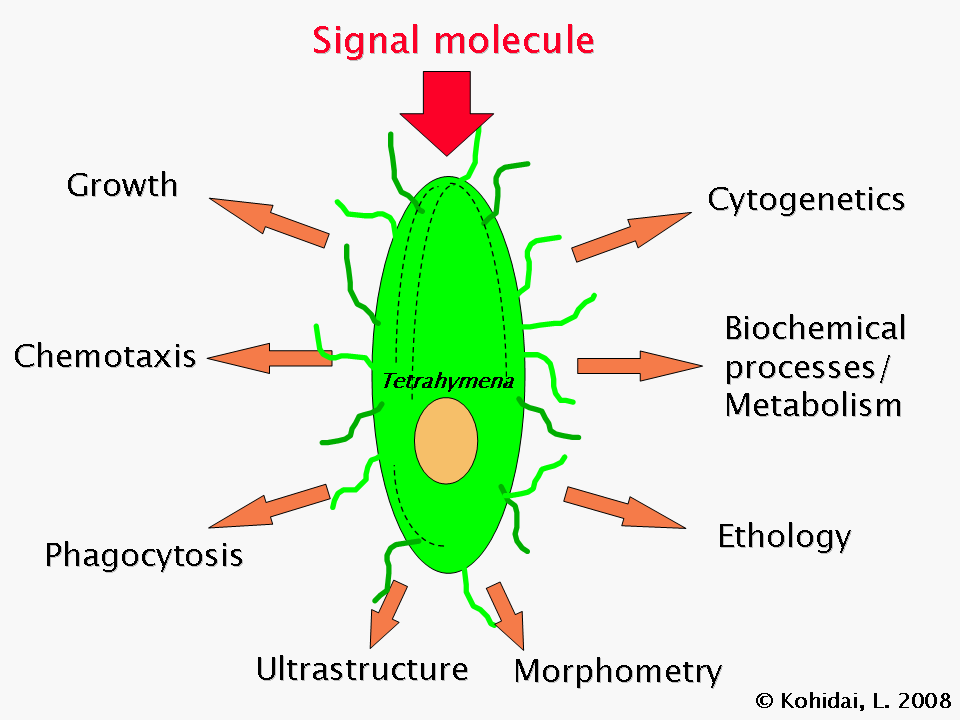
Main fields of biomedical research where Tetrahymena cells are used as models

== Life cycle ==
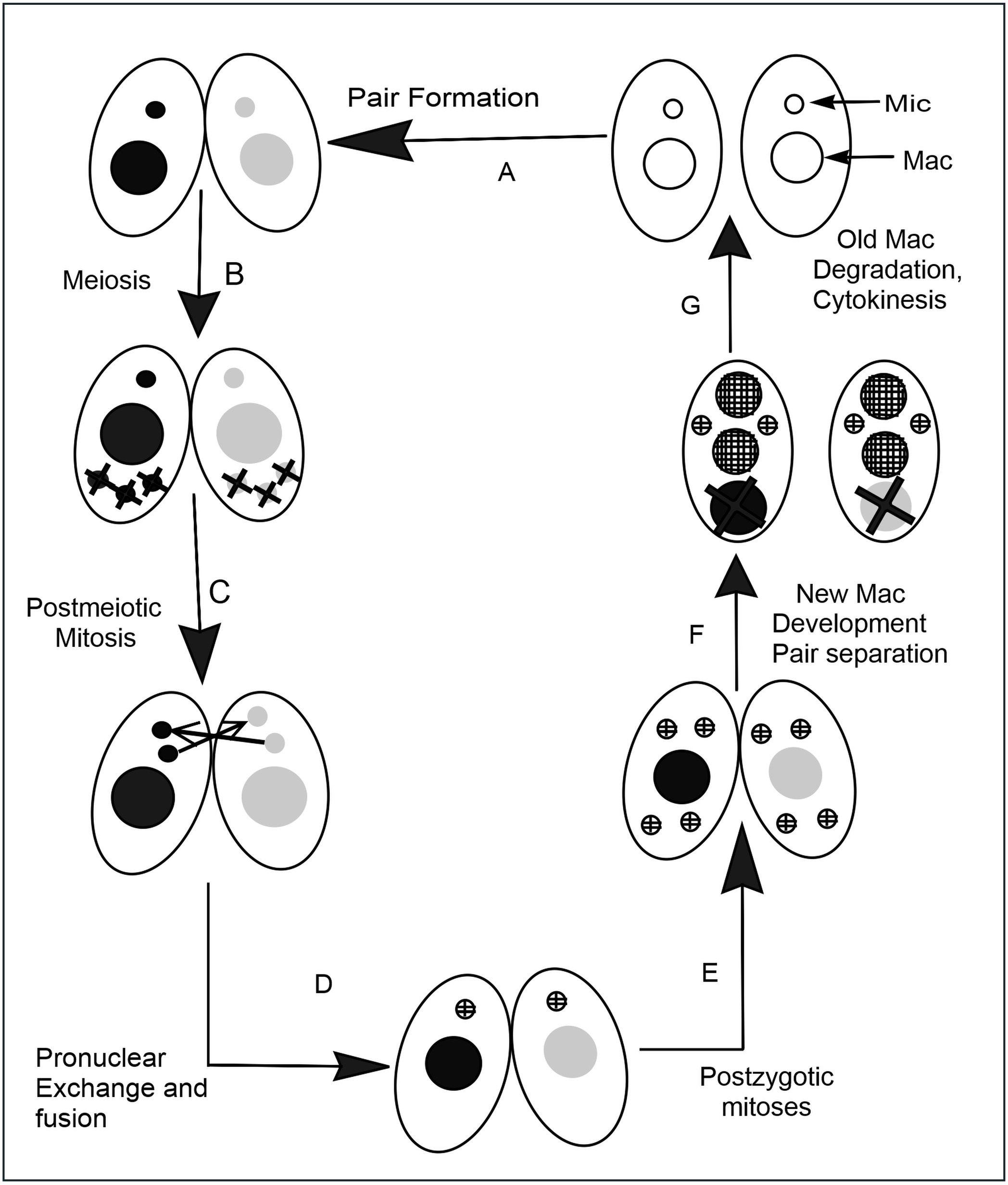
Tetrahymena conjugation. When nutrients are scarce, two individuals (A) pair with each other and begin sexual reproduction (conjugation). (B) The diploid micronucleus in each individual undergoes meiosis to form four haploid nuclei, and three of these are degraded. (C) The remaining haploid nucleus divides mitotically to form two pronuclei in each cell. (D) One of the two pronuclei in each cell is exchanged with the mating partner, and fusion leads to the formation of the diploid zygotic nucleus. (E) The zygotic nucleus divides twice mitotically to form four nuclei. (F) Two nuclei become micronuclei, and the other two differentiate to become macronuclei; the original parental macronucleus is degraded. (G) Cell division occurs and the nuclei are distributed to the daughter cells so that each progeny receives one micronucleus and one macronucleus.

The life cycle of T. thermophila consists of an alternation between asexual and sexual stages. In nutrient rich media during vegetative growth cells reproduce asexually by binary fission. This type of cell division occurs by a sequence of morphogenetic events that results in the development of duplicate sets of cell structures, one for each daughter cell. Only during starvation conditions will cells commit to sexual conjugation, pairing and fusing with a cell of opposite mating type. Tetrahymena has seven mating types; each of which can mate with any of the other six without preference, but not its own.

Typical of ciliates, T. thermophila differentiates its genome into two functionally distinct types of nuclei, each specifically used during the two different stages of the life cycle. The diploid germline micronucleus is transcriptionally silent and only plays a role during sexual life stages. The germline nucleus contains 5 pairs of chromosomes which encode the heritable information passed down from one sexual generation to the next. During sexual conjugation, haploid micronuclear meiotic products from both parental cells fuse, leading to the creation of a new micro- and macronucleus in progeny cells. Sexual conjugation occurs when cells starved for at least 2hrs in a nutrient-depleted media encounter a cell of complementary mating type. After a brief period of co-stimulation (~1hr), starved cells begin to pair at their anterior ends to form a specialized region of membrane called the conjugation junction.

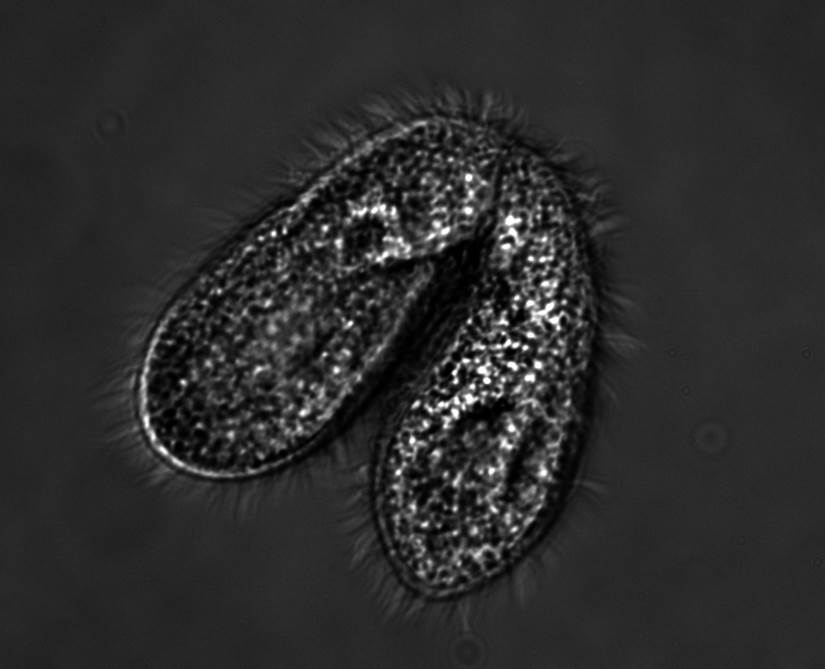
Two Tetrahymena cells of complementary mating types pair to exchange nuclei during sexual conjugation.

It is at this junctional zone that several hundred fusion pores form, allowing for the mutual exchange of protein, RNA and eventually a meiotic product of their micronucleus. This whole process takes about 12 hours at 30 °C, but even longer than this at cooler temperatures. The sequence of events during conjugation is outlined in the accompanying figure.

The larger polyploid macronucleus is transcriptionally active, meaning its genes are actively expressed, and so it controls somatic cell functions during vegetative growth. The polyploid nature of the macronucleus refers to the fact that it contains approximately 200–300 autonomously replicating linear DNA mini-chromosomes. These minichromosomes have their own telomeres and are derived via site-specific fragmentation of the five original micronuclear chromosomes during sexual development. In T. thermophila each of these minichromosomes encodes multiple genes and exists at a copy number of approximately 45–50 within the macronucleus. The exception to this is the minichromosome encoding the rDNA, which is massively upregulated, existing at a copy number of approximately 10,000 within the macronucleus. Because the macronucleus divides amitotically during binary fission, these minichromosomes are un-equally divided between the clonal daughter cells. Through natural or artificial selection, this method of DNA partitioning in the somatic genome can lead to clonal cell lines with different macronuclear phenotypes fixed for a particular trait, in a process called phenotypic assortment. In this way, the polyploid genome can fine-tune its adaptation to environmental conditions through gain of beneficial mutations on any given mini-chromosome whose replication is then selected for, or conversely, loss of a minichromosome which accrues a negative mutation. However, the macronucleus is only propagated from one cell to the next during the asexual, vegetative stage of the life cycle, and so it is never directly inherited by sexual progeny. Only beneficial mutations that occur in the germline micronucleus of T. thermophila are passed down between generations, but these mutations would never be selected for environmentally in the parental cells because they are not expressed.

== Behavior ==
Free swimming cells of Tetrahymena are attracted to certain chemicals by chemokinesis. The major chemo-attractants are peptides and/or proteins.

A 2016 study found that cultured Tetrahymena have the capacity to 'learn' the shape and size of their swimming space. Cells confined in a droplet of a water for a short time were, upon release, found to repeat the circular swimming trajectories 'learned' in the droplet. The diameter and duration of these swimming paths reflected the size of the droplet and time allowed to adapt.

== DNA repair ==
It is common among protists that the sexual cycle is inducible by stressful conditions such as starvation. Such conditions often cause DNA damage. A central feature of meiosis is homologous recombination between non-sister chromosomes. In T. thermophila this process of meiotic recombination may be beneficial for repairing DNA damages caused by starvation.

Exposure of T. thermophila to UV light resulted in a greater than 100-fold increase in Rad51 gene expression. Treatment with the DNA alkylating agent methyl methanesulfonate also resulted in substantially elevated Rad 51 protein levels. These findings suggest that ciliates such as T. thermophila utilize a Rad51-dependent recombinational pathway to repair damaged DNA.

The Rad51 recombinase of T. thermophila is a homolog of the Escherichia coli RecA recombinase. In T. thermophila, Rad51 participates in homologous recombination during mitosis, meiosis and in the repair of double-strand breaks. During conjugation, Rad51 is necessary for completion of meiosis. Meiosis in T. thermophila appears to employ a Mus81-dependent pathway that does not use a synaptonemal complex and is considered secondary in most other model eukaryotes. This pathway includes the Mus81 resolvase and the Sgs1 helicase. The Sgs1 helicase appears to promote the non-crossover outcome of meiotic recombinational repair of DNA, a pathway that generates little genetic variation.

== Phenotypic and genotypic plasticity ==
Many species of Tetrahymena are known to display unique response mechanisms to stress and various environmental pressures. The unique genomic architecture of the ciliates (presence of a MIC, high ploidy, large number of chromosomes, etc.) allows for differential gene expression, as well as increased genomic flexibility. The following is a non-exhaustive list of examples of phenotypic and genotypic plasticity in the Tetrahymena genus.

=== Inducible trophic polymorphisms ===
T. vorax is known for its inducible trophic polymorphisms, an ecologically offensive tactic that allows it to change its feeding strategy and diet by altering its morphology. Normally, T. vorax is a bacterivorous microstome around 60 μm in length. However, it has the ability to switch into a carnivorous macrostome around 200 μm in length that can feed on larger competitors. If T. vorax cells are too nutrient starved to undertake transformation, they have also been recorded as transforming into a third "tailed"-microstome morph, thought to be a defense mechanism in response to cannibalistic pressure. While T. vorax is the most well studied Tetrahymena that exhibits inducible trophic polymorphisms, many lesser known species are able to undertake transformation as well, including T. paulina and T. paravorax. However, only T. vorax has been recorded as having both a macrostome and tailed-microstome form.

These morphological switches are triggered by an abundance of stomatin in the environment, a mixture of metabolic compounds released by competitor species, such as Paramecium, Colpidium, and other Tetrahymena. Specifically, chromatographic analysis has revealed that ferrous iron, hypoxanthine, and uracil are the chemicals in stomatin responsible for triggering the morphological change. Many researchers cite "starvation conditions" as inducing the transformation, as in nature, the compound inducers are in highest concentration after microstomal ciliates have grazed down bacterial populations, and ciliate populations are high. When the chemical inducers are in high concentration, T. vorax cells will transform at higher rates, allowing them to prey on their former trophic competitors.

The exact genetic, and structural mechanisms that underlie T. vorax transformation are unknown. However, some progress has been made in identifying candidate genes. Researchers from the University of Alabama have used cDNA subtraction to remove actively transcribed DNA from microstome and macrostome T. vorax cells, leaving only differentially transcribed cDNA molecules. While nine differentiation-specific genes were found, the most frequently expressed candidate gene was identified as a novel sequence, SUBII-TG.

The sequenced region of SUBII-TG was 912 bp long and consists of three largely identical 105 bp open-reading frames. A northern blot analysis revealed that low levels of transcription are detected in microstome cells, while high levels of transcription occur in macrostome cells. Furthermore, when the researchers limited SUBII-TG expression in the presence of stomatin (using antisense oligonucleotide methods), a 55% reduction in SUBII-TG mRNA correlated with a 51% decrease in transformation, supporting the notion that the gene is at least partially responsible for controlling the transformation in T. vorax. However, very little is known about the SUBII-TG gene. Researchers were only able to sequence a portion of the entire open-reading frame, and other candidate genes have not been investigated thoroughly. mRNA and amino acid sequencing indicate that ubiquitin may play a crucial role in allowing transformation to take place as well. However, no known genes in the ubiquitin family have been identified in T. vorax. Finally, the genetic mechanisms of the "tailed" microstome morph are completely unknown.

=== Metal resistance, gene and genome amplification ===
Other related species exhibit their own unique responses to various stressors. In T. thermophila, chromosome amplification and gene expansion are inducible responses to common organometallic pollutants such as cadmium, copper, and lead. Strains of T. thermophila that were exposed to large quantities of Cd^{2+} over time were found to have a 5-fold increase of MTT1, and MTT3 (metallothionein genes that code for Cadmium and Lead binding proteins) as well as CNBDP, an unrelated gene that lies just upstream of MTT1 on the same chromosome. The fact that a non-metallothionein gene on the same locus as MTT1 and MTT3 increased copy number indicates that the entire chromosome had been amplified, as opposed to just specific genes. Tetrahymena species are 45-ploid for their macronucleus, meaning that the wild type of T. thermophila normally contains 45 copies of each chromosome. While the actual number of unique chromosomes are unknown, the number is thought to be around 187 in the MAC, and 5 in the MIC. Thus, the Ca^{2+} adapted strain contained 225 copies of the specific chromosome in question. This resulted in a nearly 28-fold increase in detected expression levels of MTT1, and slightly less in MTT3.

When researchers grew a sample of the T. thermophila population in normal growth medium (lacking Cd^{2+}) for one month, the number of MTT1, MTT3, and CNBDP genes decreased to an average of three copies (135C). By seven months in normal growth medium, the T. thermophila cells were found reduced to just the wild type copy number (45C). When researchers returned cells from the same colony to Cd^{2+} medium, within a week MTT1, MTT3, and CNBDP genes increased to three copies once again (135C). Thus, the authors argue that chromosome amplification is an inducible and reversible mechanism in the Tetrahymena genetic response to metal stress.

Researchers also used gene-knockdown experiments, where the copy number of another metallothionein gene on a different chromosome, MTT5, was dramatically reduced. Within a week, the new strain was found to have developed four novel genes from at least one duplication of MTT1. However, chromosome duplication had not taken place, as indicated by the wild-type ploidy and the normal quantity of other genes on the same chromosomes. Rather, researchers believe that the duplication resulted from homologous recombination events, producing transcriptionally active, upregulated genes that carry repeated MTT1.

=== Enhanced motility and dispersal ===
T. thermophila also undergoes phenotypic changes when faced with limited resource availability. Cells are capable of changing their shape and size, along with behavioral swimming strategies in response to starvation. The more motile cells that change in response to starvation are known as dispersers, or disperser cells. While rates and levels of phenotypic change differ between strains, disperser cells form in nearly all strains of T. thermophila when faced with starvation. Dispersers, and non-dispersing cells both become dramatically thinner and smaller, increasing the basal body and cilia density, allowing them to swim between two and three times faster than normal cells. Some strains of T. thermophila have also been found to develop a single, non-beating, enlarged cilia that assists the cell in steering or directing movement. While the behavior has been shown to correlate with faster dispersal and form as a reversible trait in Tetrahymena cells, little is known about the genetic or cellular mechanisms that allow for its development. Furthermore, other studies show that when genetically variable populations of T. thermophila were starved, dispersal cells actually increased in cell length, despite still becoming thinner. More research is needed to determine the genetic mechanisms that underlie disperser formation.

== Species in genus ==
Species in this genus include.

- Tetrahymena americanis
- Tetrahymena asiatica
- Tetrahymena australis
- Tetrahymena bergeri
- Tetrahymena borealis
- Tetrahymena canadensis
- Tetrahymena capricornis
- Tetrahymena caudata
- Tetrahymena chironomi
- Tetrahymena corlissi
- Tetrahymena cosmopolitanis
- Tetrahymena dimorpha
- Tetrahymena edaphoni
- Tetrahymena elliotti
- Tetrahymena empidokyrea
- Tetrahymena farahensis
- Tetrahymena farleyi
- Tetrahymena furgasoni
- Tetrahymena glochidiophila
- Tetrahymena hegewischi
- Tetrahymena hyperangularis
- Tetrahymena leucophrys
- Tetrahymena limacis
- Tetrahymena lwoffi
- Tetrahymena malaccensis
- Tetrahymena mimbres
- Tetrahymena mobilis
- Tetrahymena nanneyi
- Tetrahymena nipissingi
- Tetrahymena paravorax
- Tetrahymena patula
- Tetrahymena pigmentosa
- Tetrahymena pyriformis
- Tetrahymena rostrata
- Tetrahymena rotunda
- Tetrahymena setifera
- Tetrahymena setigera
- Tetrahymena setosa
- Tetrahymena shanghaiensis
- Tetrahymena sialidos
- Tetrahymena silvana
- Tetrahymena skappus
- Tetrahymena sonneborni
- Tetrahymena stegomyiae
- Tetrahymena thermophila
- Tetrahymena tropicalis
- Tetrahymena vorax

== In education ==
Cornell University offers a National Institutes of Health (NIH) funded program through the Science Education Partnership Award (SEPA) Program called Advancing Secondary Science Education thru Tetrahymena (ASSET). The group develops stand-alone labs or lessons using Tetrahymena as training modules that teachers can use in classes.
