= Amitosis =

Cell proliferation that does not occur by mitosis

Amitosis, also known as karyostenosis, direct cell division, or binary fission, is a form of asexual cell division that occurs in most prokaryotes. It differs from other forms of cell division (e.g., mitosis, meiosis) as it does not involve the mitotic apparatus (spindle formation) or the condensation of chromatin into chromosomes prior to cellular division.

Several instances of cell division previously thought to be "non-mitotic", such as the division of some unicellular eukaryotes, may actually occur by "closed mitosis", which differs from open or semi-closed mitotic processes. These processes involve mitotic chromosomes and are classified based on the condition of the nuclear envelope. Amitosis can also affect the distribution of human lactic acid dehydrogenase isoenzymes, which are present in almost all body tissues. An example of amitosis is spermatogenesis. During amitosis, the cell membrane does not divide.

Cells containing two or more nuclei are called binucleated and multinucleated cells, respectively, which can also result from the fusion of cells. Although amitosis differs fundamentally from mitosis without cytokinesis, some similarities exist between amitosis and cell fusion. Amitosis can result in nearly haploid nuclei, which is not possible through mitosis or cell fusion.

== Discovery ==
Amitosis was first described in 1880 by Walther Flemming, who also described mitosis and other forms of cell division. Initially it was common for biologists to think of cells having the ability to divide both mitotically and amitotically.

== Process ==
Amitosis is the division of cells in the interphase state, typically achieved by a simple constriction into two sometimes unequal halves without any regular segregation of genetic material. This process results in the random distribution of parental chromosomes in the daughter cells, in contrast to mitosis, which involves the precise distribution of chromosomes. Amitosis does not involve the maximal condensation of chromatin into chromosomes, a molecular event observable by light microscopy when sister chromatids align along the metaphase plate.

While amitosis has been reported in ciliates, its role in mammalian cell proliferation remains unconfirmed. The discovery of copy number variations (CNVs) in mammalian cells within an organ has challenged the assumption that every cell in an organism must inherit an exact copy of the parental genome to be functional. Instead of CNVs stemming from errors in mitosis, such variations could have arisen from amitosis and may even be beneficial to the cells. Additionally, ciliates possess a mechanism for adjusting the copy numbers of individual genes during amitosis of the macronucleus.

== Mechanism ==
Additional reports of non-mitotic proliferation and insights into its underlying mechanisms have emerged from extensive work with polyploid cells. Multiple copies of the genome in a cell population may play a role in the cell's adaptation to the environment.

Polyploid cells are frequently "reduced" to diploid cells by amitosis. Naturally occurring polyploid placental cells have been observed to produce nuclei with diploid or near-diploid complements of DNA. These nuclei, derived from polyploid placental cells, receive one or more copies of a microscopically identifiable region of chromatin. This amitotic process can result in representative transmission of chromatin. In rat polyploid trophoblasts, the nuclear envelope of the giant nucleus is involved in this subdivision. Polyploid cells may also be key to the survival processes underlying chemotherapy resistance in certain cells.

Following the treatment of cultured cells with mitosis-inhibiting chemicals, similar to those used in some chemotherapeutic protocols, a small population of induced polyploid cells survives. Eventually, this population gives rise to "normal" diploid cells by forming polyploid chromatin bouquets that return to an interphase state before separating into several secondary nuclei. The controlled autophagic degradation of DNA and the production of nuclear envelope-limited sheets accompany the process. Since this process of depolyploidization involves mitotic chromosomes, it conforms to the broad definition of amitosis.

The scientific literature affirms the involvement of amitosis in cell proliferation and explores multiple amitotic mechanisms capable of producing "progeny nuclei" without "mitotic chromosomes." One form of amitosis involves fissioning, where a nucleus splits in two without involving chromosomes. This has been reported in placental tissues and cells grown from such tissues in rats, as well as in human and mouse trophoblasts. Amitosis by fissioning has also been reported in mammalian liver cells and human adrenal cells. Chen and Wan reported amitosis in rat liver and presented a mechanism for a four-stage amitotic process whereby chromatin threads are reproduced and equally distributed to daughter cells as the nucleus splits in two. In macronuclear amitosis of Tetrahymena, γ-tubulin-mediated MT assembly was required.

There are multiple reports of amitosis occurring when nuclei bud out through the plasma membrane of a polyploid cell. This process has been observed in amniotic cells transformed by a virus and in mouse embryo fibroblast lines exposed to carcinogens. A similar process called extrusion has been described for mink trophoblasts, a tissue in which fissioning is also observed. Asymmetric cell division has also been described in polyploid giant cancer cells and low eukaryotic cells and is reported to occur by the amitotic processes of splitting, budding, or burst-like mechanisms.

== Examples ==
An example of amitosis particularly suited to the formation of multiple differentiated nuclei in a reasonably short period of time has been shown to occur during the differentiation of fluid-enclosing hemispheres called domes from adherent Ishikawa endometrial monolayer cells during an approximately 20-hour period. Aggregates of nuclei from monolayer syncytia become enveloped in mitochondrial membranes, forming structures (mitonucleons) that become elevated as a result of vacuole formation during the initial 6 hours of differentiation. In other systems, such changes accompany apoptosis, but not in differentiating Ishikawa cells, where the processes appear to accompany changes in DNA essential for the newly created, differentiated dome cells. Finally, the chromatin filaments emerging from these processes form a mass from which dozens of dome nuclei are amitotically generated over approximately 3 hours with the apparent involvement of nuclear envelope-limited sheets.

== In development ==
Examination of fetal guts during development (5 to 7 weeks), colonic adenomas, and adenocarcinomas has revealed nuclei that appear as hollow bells encased in tubular syncytia. These structures can either divide symmetrically by an amitotic nuclear fission process, forming new "bells", or undergo fission asymmetrically, resulting in one of seven other nuclear morphotypes, five of which appear to be specific to development since they are rarely observed in adult organisms.

The current body of literature suggests that amitosis may be involved in cellular development in humans, likely during the fetal and embryonic phases of development when the majority of these cells are produced.

When the intestinal stem cells (ISCs) in fruit flies' guts are seriously reduced, they use amitosis to repair the damage. Cells in another part of the gut, called enterocytes, reduce the number of chromosomes without going through the normal division process. This helps replace the lost ISCs, keeping the gut functioning properly.
