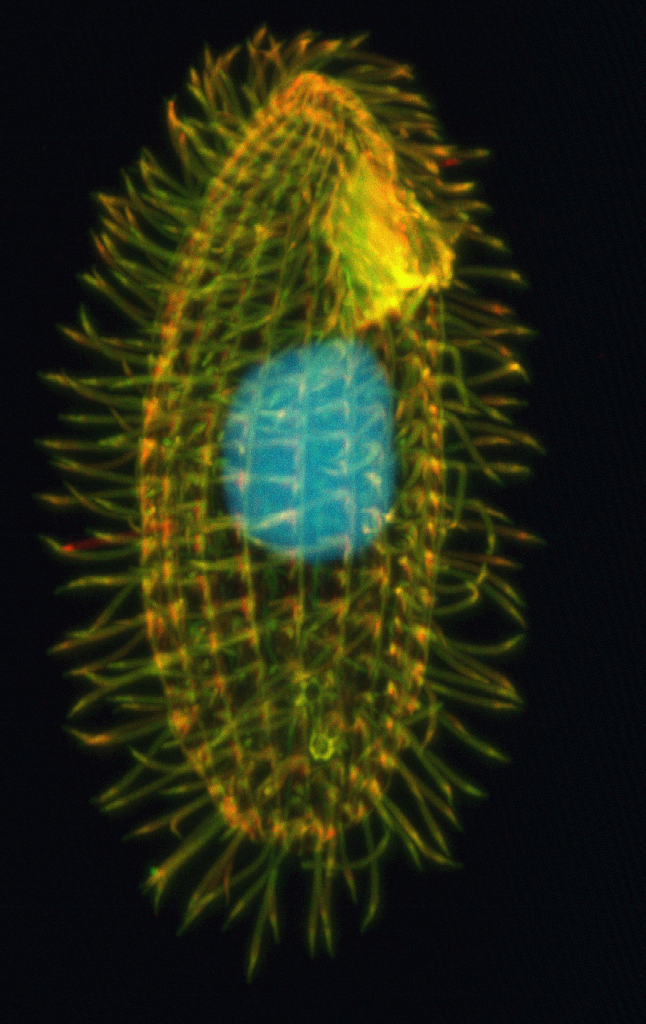
- Tetrahymena thermophila

Scientific classification
- Domain: Eukaryota
- Clade: Sar
- Clade: Alveolata
- Phylum: Ciliophora
- Class: Oligohymenophorea
- Subclass: Hymenostomatia; Delage & Hérouard, 1896
- Order: Hymenostomatida; Delage & Hérouard 1896

Typical families
- Suborder Tetrahymenina; Curimostomatidae; Tetrahymenidae; Turaniellidae; Glaucomidae; Suborder Ophryoglenina; Ichthyopthiriidae; Ophryoglenidae; Suborder Peniculina

= Hymenostome =

Order of single-celled organisms

The hymenostomes are an order of ciliate protozoa. Most are free-living in freshwater, such as the commonly studied genus Tetrahymena, but some are parasitic on fish or aquatic invertebrates. Among these is the important species Ichthyophthirius multifiliis, a common cause of death in aquaria and fish farms.

The hymenostomes are fairly typical members of the Oligohymenophorea. Their body cilia are mostly uniform, sometimes with a few long caudal cilia, and arise from monokinetids or from dikinetids at the anterior. The oral cilia are in general distinctly tetrahymenal, with three membranelles and a paroral membrane, which corresponds only to the middle segment of the tripartite membranes found in certain scuticociliates. Mouth formation during cell division usually begins next to a postoral kinety.

The hymenostomes were first defined by Delage & Hérouard in 1896. Initially the scuticociliates and peniculids were included, then later treated as separate orders of a subclass Hymenostomatia, to which the astomes are sometimes added. More recently each of these groups tends to be treated as a separate subclass.
