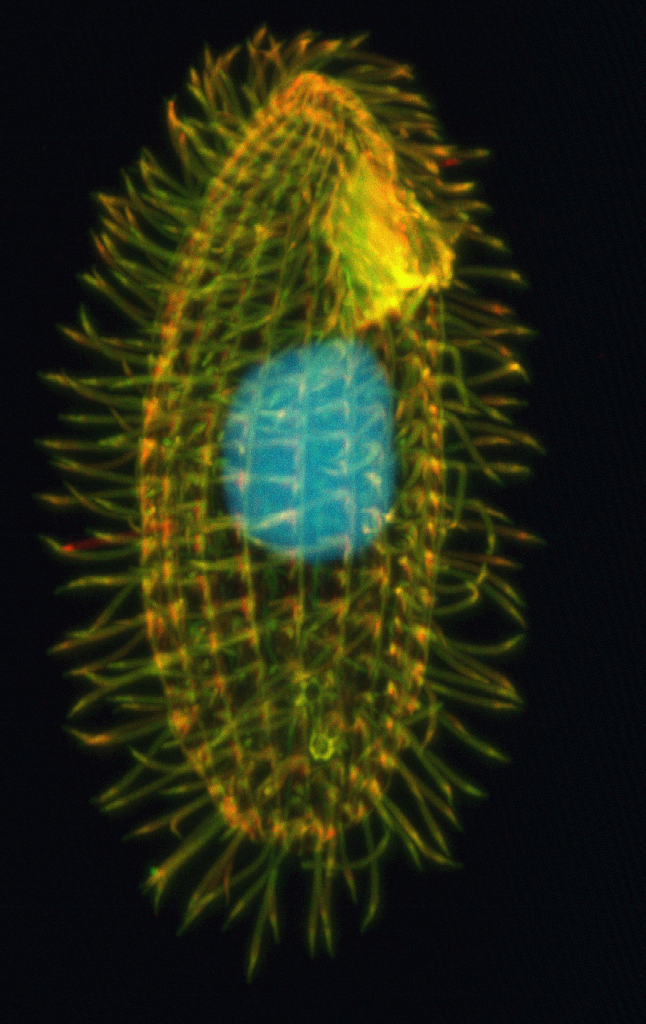
- Tetrahymena thermophila

Scientific classification
- Domain: Eukaryota
- Clade: Sar
- Clade: Alveolata
- Phylum: Ciliophora
- Class: Oligohymenophorea
- Order: Hymenostomatida
- Suborder: Tetrahymenina
- Family: Tetrahymenidae

= Tetrahymenidae =

Family of protozoans

Tetrahymenidae is a family of ciliates.
