= Simon Regan =

British journalist

Simon Regan (7 August 1942 – 8 August 2000) was a British journalist best known for founding Scallywag magazine, which deliberately took risks with libellous articles about public figures. He also worked on the News of the World and late in his career focused on criminal convictions he believed were miscarriages of justice.

== Early life ==
Regan was born in Trowbridge, Wiltshire, in a home for single mothers. He was brought up in Hampstead in a mansion owned by his grandmother, where many of the rooms were rented out. His parents were supporters of the Communist Party of Great Britain and were visited by many East European intellectuals. Regan attended Haverstock Comprehensive School, and wrote poetry for John O'London's Magazine while in his teens.

== Journalistic career ==
Having moved to Winchester, Hampshire, Regan became a journalist for a local paper before moving to London as a freelance. In March 1967, the Press Council criticised him for a piece he contributed to The Sun about a woman who had become pregnant after a sterilization operation.

He landed a staff job on the News of the World in 1967 where he specialised in writing stories exposing cannabis-taking, Trotskyite student conspiracies, a world he was close to as a user of cannabis himself. Despite often attacking senior staff at the News of the World, Regan was popular with readers and wrote his pieces in line with the newspaper's view. He also worked on police corruption stories.

== Royal reporter ==
After leaving the News of the World, Regan wrote biographies. He started with his former proprietor Rupert Murdoch, and then followed with two royal biographies. A reviewer found the biography of Murdoch "disgracefully ill-written and ill-constructed". Regan's biography of Prince Charles, "Charles, The Clown Prince", was based on letters and paintings by the young Prince which had been stolen from Buckingham Palace, and the Royal solicitors wrote to the publishers to remind them of the law of Copyright. His second royal biography, "Margaret - A Love Story", claimed to reveal details of Princess Margaret's love life.

Meanwhile, Regan became a freelance editor and public relations adviser. He founded a journal which he called "Butterfly News", chiefly to attack personal targets including Coca-Cola, the National Farmers Union and the main figures in butterfly collecting.

== Royal scandal ==
In April 1981, Regan obtained transcripts of telephone calls made by Prince Charles in Australia to Lady Diana Spencer, then his fiancée. In addition to revealing their intimate conversation, Charles could be heard making disparaging remarks about Malcolm Fraser, then Prime Minister of Australia, and about some aspects of Australian culture. They were bought by Die Aktuelle, a German magazine; the Prince and Lady Diana obtained an injunction preventing Regan from disclosing or publishing the contents of the transcripts, but Die Aktuelle was not affected and published the transcripts on 8 May despite a German court having also injuncted them against publication.

The Prince's lawyer later insisted that the tapes were forgeries, while Regan insisted they were genuine.

== Scallywag ==
In 1989, Regan founded Scallywag magazine in South Dorset when the lure of journalism drew him back from his retirement in Butterfly World in Lodmoor Park, Weymouth. Initially, Scallywag was a local magazine seeking to expose local issues. A recurrent theme was illegal tipping on the nearby Lodmoor refuse depot, where he accused council staff of taking bribes to allow dangerous chemicals to be tipped. He also claimed widespread police corruption associated with Freemasonry in Dorset and claimed to have been beaten up by two off-duty policemen in College Lane, Weymouth. He also 'named and shamed' people he perceived as being paedophiles. However, like so many of his campaigns, no substantial legally acceptable evidence was ever produced.

Regan was inspired by the early years of Private Eye, but he felt that the Eye had become too cautious of libel actions and determined not to fall into the same trap. At one difficult time, he sold Scallywag to a friend, who had no assets, which allowed Regan greater freedom to pursue stories. Scallywag started to attract a loyal readership, although the major newspaper distributors refused to handle it (a situation Regan regarded as tantamount to censorship). Nevertheless, in 1991, Scallywag moved to London and became a national publication.

Scallywag became a news story in itself in 1993, when it stoked a rumour that John Major, then Prime Minister, was having an affair with Clare Latimer, who was a freelance cook who helped with state dinners at 10 Downing Street. A story in the New Statesman showed how the rumours had been covertly mentioned in mainstream papers. When Major heard of the New Statesman story, he sued both them and Scallywag for libel; he also sued the distributors and printers of both papers, which contributed to nearly driving the New Statesman out of business.

Clare Latimer later claimed that "Mr Major used her as a "decoy" to prevent what would have been the more politically damaging exposure of the affair he had with Edwina Currie from 1984 to 1988." New Statesman editor Peter Wilby said that, had Major's previous adultery been known at the time of the libel case, the outcome may have been different.

== Out of business ==
Scallywag limped on, but a 1994 story about Conservative politician Julian Lewis led to another series of libel actions, which the magazine lost comprehensively. Scallywag disappeared from print and moved to a site on the World Wide Web instead. Lewis followed and won damages from Scallywag's internet service provider, closing the site down.

Regan responded by accusing Lewis of lying, and decided to attempt to sabotage Lewis' campaign in New Forest East where he was the Conservative candidate for the 1997 election. Unfortunately for Regan, Lewis was aware of an obscure section of electoral law and when he obtained a taped confession from Regan that his aim was to cost Lewis votes, Lewis was able to get Regan convicted of spreading false statements about an election candidate.

== Later life ==
In his final years, Regan devoted himself to propagating his belief that Diana, Princess of Wales, had been killed in a conspiracy. He also set up a website called "Scandals in justice" which sought to expose wrongful convictions, and wrote occasionally for The Guardian. In 2000, he was convicted of "disseminating malicious falsehoods." Regan was married and divorced twice; he had five daughters, one of whom (Charlotte) stood as an Independent in the 2001 general election in Regent's Park and Kensington North. He also had a son whom he never met. Regan died after a short illness in 2000.
