= Shenda =

Shenda may be:

- Shenda highway, running between Shenyang and Dalian, Liaoning, China
- A colloquial name for Shenzhen University, Guangdong, China
  - Shenda Station, Shenzhen Metro Line 1, which is named for the university

People with the name Shenda include:

- Shenda Amery, British painter
