= Scallywag (magazine) =

Scallywag magazine was published in London between 1991 and 1995. The subtitle of issues 1 - 6 was "Camden's only alternative community magazine". It sought to publish controversial journalism which other satirical and investigative publications (such as Private Eye) were said to be unwilling to publish over fears of litigation. It was founded and edited by Simon Regan and Angus James, Regan's half-brother.

A previous version was published in Dorset, and the first issue of the 'Camden Scallywag' says that the Dorset version was then "on edition 37".

In 1993 it was sued under English libel law by the then Prime Minister of the United Kingdom, John Major, over reporting rumours that he had had an affair with a Downing Street caterer, even though it had said the allegations were false. By also suing the magazine's distributors, he received a settlement from them, and they passed the costs onto the magazine. Scallywag's financial position never recovered.

At least 30 issues were published. Nos 1 - 3 were undated, no. 4 is dated February 1992, nos 27 - 30 are dated 1995. No 12, which was the magazine that contained the article "Take-Away Midnight Feasts At Number 10" that John Major sued over, is dated January 1993.

A number of issues have been archived.
