= My Old Man: A Personal History of Music Hall =

Non-fiction book by John Major

- Author: John Major
- Language: English
- Publisher: HarperCollins
- Publication date: 2012
- Publication place: United Kingdom
- Media type: Print
- Pages: 448
- ISBN: 9780007450152

My Old Man: A Personal History of Music Hall is a 2012 non-fiction book detailing the history of music halls and their performers. Written by former British prime minister John Major, it also served as a personal tribute to his parents, both of whom were performers in music halls. It was published by HarperCollins.

== Background ==
John Major's parents, Gwen and Tom Major, had both worked in music halls before John had been born. Tom was, among other acts, a singer, acrobat and baton twirler. He had married, and formed a double act with, fellow performer Kitty Grant, (Note: Born Abraham Thomas Ball, he took the stage name Major as part of his and Kitty's double act "Drum & Major".) until she was killed by falling theatre equipment. He later married Gwen Coates, a music hall dancer, and retired in 1930.

== Content ==
The book traces the history of the music hall, through its "pre-history" (pleasure gardens, glee clubs, penny gaffs, etc.), and through the 1852 opening of the first purpose built music hall in Lambeth, to the proliferation across the country and beyond, reaching a peak in the 1890s. It details the culture of the venues as well as the conditions under which performers worked. Major also uses the history to present a number of biographical sketches of the various individual performers.

== Reception ==
Reception in the popular press was generally positive, with Simon Callow, of The Guardian, finding the work very empathetic to the performers and non-moralising about the culture of the theatres. He was also complimentary regarding the book's treatment of women performers, with its sketches of Jenny Hill, Vesta Tilley and Annie Hindle being singled out for praise. The Independent's William Cook found the book an "entertaining and intriguing potted history, full of quirky details". A review in The Telegraph praised the new perspective that Major brought to the subject, contending that "much [of] music hall history has a Left-wing inflection". Literary theorist, critic Terry Eagleton, writing for the London Review of Books, thought the work a "learned, affectionate narrative [which was] done very well indeed", commending the amount of research which underpinned it, while noting the lack of references.

On the other hand, academic opinion was more critical. A review in the Journal of Victorian Culture, by social and cultural historian of modern Britain Peter Bailey, found the book mainly retrod very well covered ground, in terms of the history of the music hall, and while a "very readable account for newcomers", its following of "blinkered orthodoxy of older accounts" and lack of references or a bibliography, left the book "innocent of any historiographical awareness". Similarly, Adam Ainsworth, in the Theatre Notebook, felt that the most interesting parts of the book, the personal stories of Major's parents and recounting of the lives of successful lesser-known artists (which he thinks an understudied area), was largely overshadowed and subsumed by the "abundance of well-known detail".
