= 1995 Conservative Party leadership election =

British leadership election to challenge John Major

- 4 July 1995
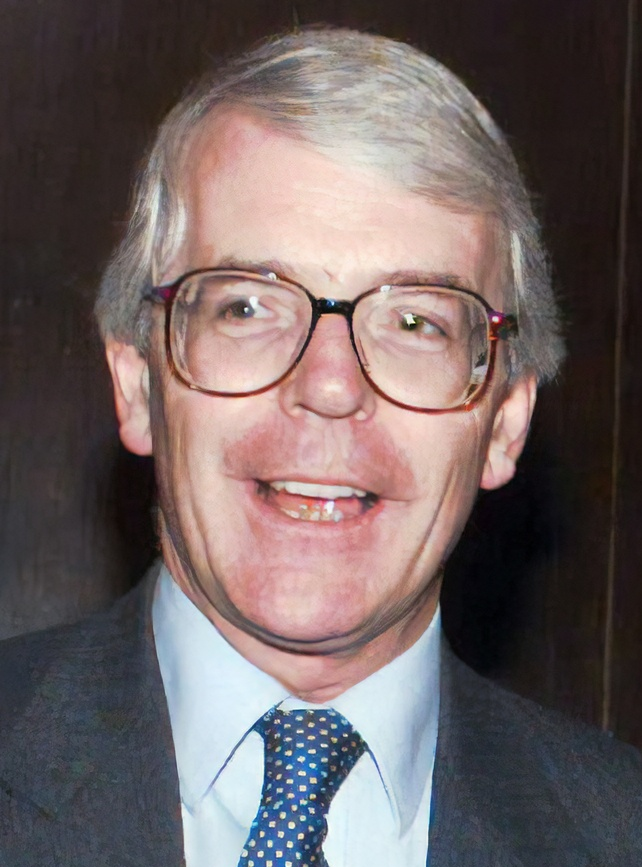

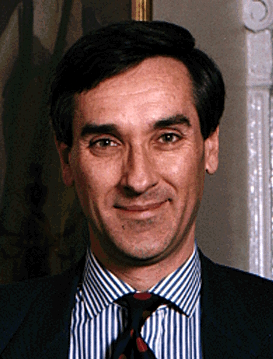
Candidate	John Major	John Redwood
MPs' ballot	218 (66.3%)	89 (27.1%)
Leader before election
John Major
Elected Leader
John Major

The 1995 Conservative Party leadership election was initiated when the incumbent leader and prime minister, John Major, resigned as Conservative leader on 22 June 1995, in order to face a leadership challenge from his critics within the party. On 4 July 1995, he was re-elected, beating the only other candidate, the former Secretary of State for Wales, John Redwood.

For some years the Conservative Party had been deeply divided on the issue of the European Union and there had been much speculation each year that Major would be challenged for the leadership during the annual re-election of the leader each November. Many both within and outside the party believed that the constant speculation was highly damaging and so Major took the dramatic step to force an early contest. He announced his decision in a speech in the garden of 10 Downing Street, challenging his party opponents to "put up or shut up".

The Conservative government was also proving unpopular with the British public at the time, trailing the Labour Party in opinion polls and having suffered heavy losses in local elections for three successive years, as well as a poor performance in the previous year's European elections.

== Rules ==
Under the rules at the time, introduced in 1965 and modified in 1975, there would be a series of ballots conducted by the 1922 Committee, with the committee's chairman, Sir Marcus Fox, serving as Returning Officer.

Since the leadership was vacant, a contest required the nomination of only two candidates. Under the rules in force, to win in the first round, a candidate not only needed to win the backing of an absolute majority of members of parliament, but also needed a majority over the runner-up of 15 per cent of the total electorate. If neither of these were achieved, then a second ballot would take place in the following week, nominations would be reopened, and at this stage an absolute majority only would be required to win. If there were no winner on the second ballot, then the top two candidates would go forward to a third round.

Because of this process, the first round was widely regarded as the expression of confidence (or otherwise) in Major. Many speculated that if he did not achieve outright victory then he would resign, enabling other prominent Conservatives, such as Michael Heseltine or Michael Portillo, to stand in the second round.

== Candidates and their platforms ==
John Major announced he would be a candidate for re-election from the outset, and stood pledging continuity in office and the continuation of a broad-based approach to government.

The only candidate to enter the race was John Redwood, who resigned from the Cabinet as Secretary of State for Wales. Redwood ran on a staunchly Eurosceptic, Thatcherite manifesto.

=== Declined ===
There were several Conservatives who did not stand in the first round but were either widely expected to stand in the event of a second round or did not stand for another reason. They included:

- Kenneth Clarke, Chancellor of the Exchequer and on the pro-EU wing of the party
- Michael Heseltine, President of the Board of Trade who had challenged Margaret Thatcher in the contest of 1990 and also on the pro-EU wing of the party
- Norman Lamont, former Chancellor of the Exchequer and a staunch Eurosceptic
- Michael Portillo, Secretary of State for Employment and widely seen as the heir to the Thatcherite wing of the party
- Gillian Shephard, Secretary of State for Education

Interest was generated when it was reported that both Heseltine and Portillo had had a large number of telephone lines installed at offices, widely presumed (and, in Portillo's case, correctly) to be a preparation for a second round bid. When this was raised during Prime Minister's Questions, Major laughingly attributed this to the effect of telephone privatisation. During the voting, Heseltine felt the need to publicly display his ballot paper to show that he had voted for Major.

== Campaign ==
The period between the launch of the election and polling was short. The main interest occurred when Michael Heseltine publicly and strongly endorsed Major, which many commentators felt reinforced his position. Redwood's leadership bid came under much fire. His campaign slogan was "No change, no chance". A poster was issued on his behalf, written by Redwood's campaign manager David Evans, which urged Conservatives to vote Redwood to "Save Your Seat, Save Your Party, and Save Your Country".

At a personal level his nickname of "the Vulcan" reached prominence and much lampooning in the media, whilst his formal launch of his campaign was dismissed as a collection of all the mavericks on the right of the party, widely undermining his bid's credibility.

== Ballot ==
The ballot was as follows:

Only ballot: 4 July 1995
Candidate	Votes	%
John Major	218	66.3
John Redwood	89	27.1
Abstentions	10	3.0
Spoilt	12	3.6
Majority	129	39.2
Turnout	329	N/A
John Major re-elected

Major easily won both an outright majority and the necessary 15% margin. After leaving office, he revealed that he had set a private minimum target of 215 votes, which he had exceeded by only three, and stated that he had made up his mind to resign outright if he had failed to meet this threshold.

== Consequences ==
No further leadership elections took place until after the Conservatives lost the 1997 general election in the face of a Labour landslide under Tony Blair. The party temporarily reunited. Michael Heseltine had given Major staunch support in the contest, and as a result was promoted to the position of deputy prime minister. However, many believed that Heseltine had missed his last chance to become prime minister.

Portillo's failure to stand in 1995 was widely felt to have cost him dearly. Redwood emerged as a clear alternative leader of the right of the party whilst many argued Portillo had lacked the nerve to make a first round challenge and potentially allowed Major to survive. Portillo famously went on to lose his seat at the 1997 election, thus preventing him from standing for the leadership after Major resigned.

William Hague, aged only 34 at the time, was promoted to the Cabinet to Redwood's position as Welsh Secretary. When Major resigned as leader after losing the 1997 general election, Hague was thus in a position to stand for, and win, the leadership. Although Portillo quickly returned to frontline politics after winning the 1999 Kensington and Chelsea by-election (serving as Shadow Chancellor under Hague), the Conservatives suffered another landslide defeat to Labour in the 2001 general election, triggering Hague's resignation. Portillo stood on the subsequent leadership election, but ultimately lost to Iain Duncan Smith coming third. He ultimately quit politics completely at the 2005 general election, to pursue a new career as a broadcaster and TV presenter.
