= Electoral history of John Major =

List of elections featuring John Major as a candidate

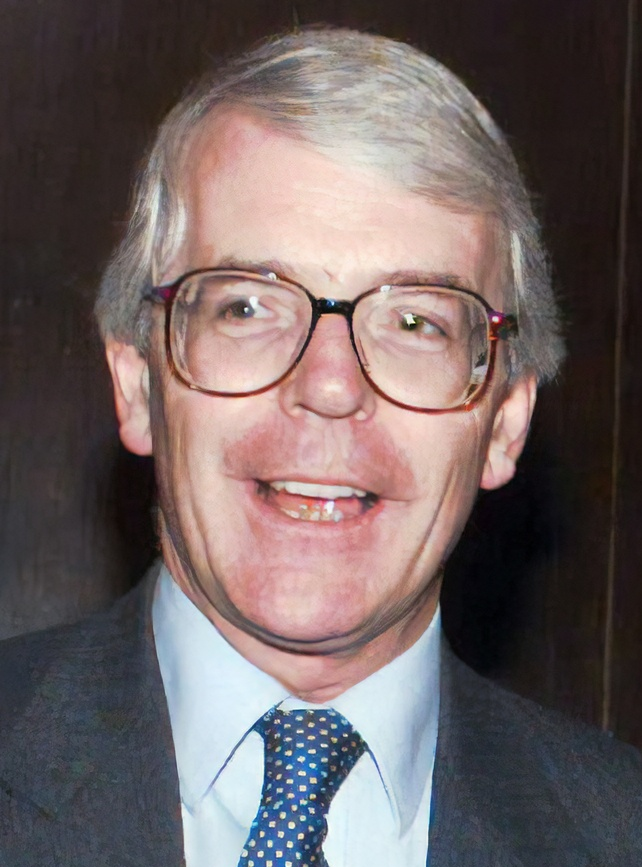
John Major

This is a summary of the electoral history of John Major, who served as Prime Minister of the United Kingdom and Leader of the Conservative Party from 1990 to 1997. He was the Member of Parliament (MP) for Huntingdon from 1979 to 2001.

== Council elections ==
=== 1964 Lambeth London Borough Council election, Larkhall ===
Larkhall (3)
Party	Candidate	Votes	%	±%
Labour	A. Crouch	1,901	66.5	
Labour	G. Gold	1,875		
Labour	W. King	1,861		
Conservative	J. Chambers	774	27.1	
Conservative	John Major	752		
Conservative	E. Brady	740		
Communist	S. Hope	107	3.7	
Independent	P. Winchester	77	2.7	
Turnout		2,755	24.5	
Registered electors		11,243		
Labour win (new seat)				
Labour win (new seat)				
Labour win (new seat)				

=== 1968 Lambeth London Borough Council election, Ferndale ===
Ferndale (3)
Party	Candidate	Votes	%	±%
Conservative	J. Langley	1,025	18.0%	
Conservative	G. Allnut	1,002	17.6%	
Conservative	John Major	991	17.4%	
Labour	L. Davis	921	16.2%	
Labour	J. Dodson	892	15.7%	
Labour	D. Packer	863	15.2%	
Turnout		5,694		
Conservative gain from Labour		Swing		
Conservative gain from Labour		Swing		
Conservative gain from Labour		Swing		

=== 1971 Lambeth London Borough Council election, Thornton ===
Thornton (3)
Party	Candidate	Votes	%
Labour	D. W. Wendon	2,205	15.3%
Labour	W. P. Weston	2,176	15.1%
Labour	H. A. Bavin	2,167	15.1%
Conservative	A. E. S. Meyer	2,065	14.4%
Conservative	John Major	2,061	14.3%
Conservative	J. S. Steele	2,055	14.3%
Liberal	J. P. Taylor	205	1.4%
Liberal	A. G. Blackmore	182	1.3%
Liberal	Mrs M. A. Granger	178	1.2%
Communist	Mrs J. E. Styles	80	0.6%
Turnout		14,376	
Labour gain from Conservative			
Labour gain from Conservative			
Labour gain from Conservative			

== Parliamentary elections ==
=== February 1974 general election, St Pancras North ===
General election February 1974: St Pancras North
Party	Candidate	Votes	%	±%
Labour	Albert Stallard	14,761	52.76	
Conservative	John Major	7,926	28.33	
Liberal	Paul J Medlicott	4,825	17.25	New
Communist	Gordon McLennan	466	1.67	
Majority		6,835	24.43	
Turnout		27,978	67.53	
Labour hold		Swing		

=== October 1974 general election, St Pancras North ===
General election October 1974: St Pancras North
Party	Candidate	Votes	%	±%
Labour	Albert Stallard	14,155	58.53	
Conservative	John Major	6,602	27.30	
Liberal	Paul J Medlicott	3,428	14.17	
Majority		7,553	31.23	
Turnout		24,185	58.10	
Labour hold		Swing	+3.4	

=== 1979 general election, Huntingdonshire ===
General election 1979: Huntingdonshire
Party	Candidate	Votes	%	±%
Conservative	John Major	40,193	55.3	+10.2
Labour	Julian G H Fulbrook	18,630	25.7	−3.9
Liberal	Dennis Graham Rowe	12,812	17.6	−7.7
National Front	K T Robinson	983	1.4	New
Majority		21,563	29.6	+14.1
Turnout		72,618	77.4	+2.3
Conservative hold		Swing	+7.1	

=== 1983 general election, Huntingdon ===
General election 1983: Huntingdon
Party	Candidate	Votes	%	±%
Conservative	John Major	34,254	62.4	
Liberal	Sheila Gatiss	13,906	25.3	
Labour	Mark Slater	6,317	11.5	
Ecology	Timothy Eiloart	444	0.8	
Majority		20,348	37.1	
Turnout		54,921	71.6	
Conservative win (new seat)				

=== 1987 general election, Huntingdon ===
General election 1987: Huntingdon
Party	Candidate	Votes	%	±%
Conservative	John Major	40,530	63.6	+1.2
SDP	Anthony Nicholson	13,486	21.1	−4.2
Labour	David Brown	8,883	13.9	+2.4
Green	William Lavin	874	1.4	+0.6
Majority		27,044	42.5	+5.4
Turnout		63,773	74.0	+2.4
Conservative hold		Swing		

=== 1992 general election, Huntingdon ===
General election 1992: Huntingdon
Party	Candidate	Votes	%	±%
Conservative	John Major	48,662	66.2	+2.6
Labour	Hugh Seckleman	12,432	16.9	+3.0
Liberal Democrats	Andrew Duff	9,386	12.8	−8.3
Liberal	Paul Wiggin	1,045	1.4	N/A
Green	Deborah Birkhead	846	1.2	−0.2
Monster Raving Loony	Screaming Lord Sutch	728	1.0	N/A
Conservative Thatcherite	Michael Flanagan	231	0.3	N/A
Gremloids	Lord Buckethead	107	0.1	N/A
Forward to Mars Party	Charles S. Cockell	91	0.1	N/A
Natural Law	David Shepherd	26	0.0	N/A
Majority		36,230	49.3	+6.8
Turnout		73,554	79.2	+5.2
Conservative hold		Swing	−0.2	

=== 1997 general election, Huntingdon ===
The constituency underwent boundary changes prior to the 1997 election and the changes are not based on the 1992 result.

General election 1997: Huntingdon
Party	Candidate	Votes	%	±%
Conservative	John Major	31,501	55.3	−9.9
Labour	Jason Reece	13,361	23.5	+6.6
Liberal Democrats	Matthew Owen	8,390	14.7	−6.4
Referendum	David Bellamy	3,114	5.5	N/A
UKIP	Charles Coyne	331	0.6	N/A
Christian Democrat	Veronica Hufford	177	0.3	N/A
Independent	Duncan Robertson	89	0.2	N/A
Majority		18,140	31.8	−6.8
Turnout		56,963	74.9	−4.3
Conservative hold		Swing	−8.3	

== Conservative Party leadership elections ==
=== 1990 leadership election ===
Second ballot: 27 November 1990
Candidate	Votes	%
John Major	185	49.7
Michael Heseltine	131	35.2
Douglas Hurd	56	15.1
Majority	54	14.5
Turnout	372	100
Third ballot required

=== 1995 leadership election ===
Only ballot: 4 July 1995
Candidate	Votes	%
John Major	218	66.3
John Redwood	89	27.1
Abstentions	10	3.0
Spoilt	12	3.6
Majority	129	39.2
Turnout	329	N/A
John Major re-elected

== United Kingdom general elections ==
=== 1992 general election ===
UK general election 1992
		Candidates						Votes		
Party	Leader	Stood	Elected	Gained	Unseated	Net	% of total	%	No.	Net %
Conservative	John Major	645	336	3	44	−41	51.69	41.9	14,094,116	−0.3
Labour	Neil Kinnock	634 (Note: Includes 27 Co-operative Party candidates, as part of the Labour-Co-op alliance)	271 (Note: Includes 14 Co-operative Party MPs, as part of the Labour-Co-op alliance)	43	1	+42 (Note: Includes +5 Co-operative Party MPs, as part of the Labour-Co-op alliance)	41.62 (Note: Includes 2.2% for the Co-operative Party, as part of the Labour-Co-op alliance)	34.4 (Note: Includes 1.5% for the Co-operative Party, as part of the Labour-Co-op alliance)	11,557,062 (Note: Includes 495,702 for the Co-operative Party, as part of the Labour-Co-op alliance)	+3.6 (Note: Includes +0.5% for the Co-operative Party, as part of the Labour-Co-op alliance)
Liberal Democrats	Paddy Ashdown	632	20	4	6	−2	3.07	17.8	6,027,038	−4.8
SNP	Alex Salmond	72	3	Steady	Steady	Steady	0.46	1.9	629,552	+0.6
UUP	James Molyneaux	13	9	Steady	Steady	Steady	1.38	0.8	270,749	0.0
SDLP	John Hume	13	4	1	Steady	+1	0.61	0.5	184,445	0.0
Green	Jean Lambert and Richard Lawson	253	0	Steady	Steady	Steady	0.0	0.5	170,047	+0.2
Plaid Cymru	Dafydd Wigley	38	4	1	Steady	+1	0.61	0.5	156,796	+0.1
DUP	Ian Paisley	7	3	Steady	Steady	Steady	0.46	0.3	103,039	0.0
Sinn Féin	Gerry Adams	14	0	Steady	1	−1	0.0	0.2	78,291	−0.1
Alliance	John Alderdice	16	0	Steady	Steady	Steady	0.0	0.2	68,695	0.0
Liberal	Michael Meadowcroft	73	0	Steady	Steady	Steady	0.0	0.2	64,744	Steady
Natural Law	Geoffrey Clements	309	0	Steady	Steady	Steady	0.0	0.2	62,888	Steady
Ind. Social Democrat	N/A	2	0	Steady	Steady	Steady	0.0	0.1	28,599	Steady
Independent	N/A	6	0	Steady	Steady	Steady	0.0	0.1	22,844	Steady
UPUP	James Kilfedder	1	1	Steady	Steady	Steady	0.15	0.1	19,305	0.0
Ind. Conservative	N/A	12	0	Steady	Steady	Steady	0.0	0.0	11,356	Steady
Monster Raving Loony	Screaming Lord Sutch	25	0	Steady	Steady	Steady	0.0	0.0	7,929	Steady
Independent	N/A	23	0	Steady	Steady	Steady	0.0	0.0	7,631	Steady
BNP	John Tyndall	13	0	Steady	Steady	Steady	0.0	0.0	7,631	Steady
SDP	John Bates	8	0	Steady	Steady	Steady	0.0	0.0	6,649	Steady
Scottish Militant Labour	Tommy Sheridan	1	0	Steady	Steady	Steady	0.0	0.0	6,287	Steady
National Front	John McAuley	14	0	Steady	Steady	Steady	0.0	0.0	4,816	Steady
True Labour	Sydney Bidwell	1	0	Steady	Steady	Steady	0.0	0.0	4,665	Steady
Anti-Federalist	Alan Sked	17	0	Steady	Steady	Steady	0.0	0.0	4,383	Steady
Workers' Party	Marian Donnelly	8	0	Steady	Steady	Steady	0.0	0.0	4,359	0.0
Official Conservative Hove Party	Nigel Furness	1	0	Steady	Steady	Steady	0.0	0.0	2,658	Steady
Loony Green	Stuart Hughes	5	0	Steady	Steady	Steady	0.0	0.0	2,538	Steady
Ind. Unionist	N/A	1	0	Steady	Steady	Steady	0.0	0.0	2,256	Steady
New Agenda	Proinsias De Rossa	2	0	Steady	Steady	Steady	0.0	0.0	2,133	Steady
Independent Progressive Socialist	N/A	1	0	Steady	Steady	Steady	0.0	0.0	1,094	Steady
Islamic Party	David Pidcock	4	0	Steady	Steady	Steady	0.0	0.0	1,085	Steady
Revolutionary Communist	Frank Furedi	8	0	Steady	Steady	Steady	0.0	0.0	745	Steady
Independent Nationalist	N/A	1	0	Steady	Steady	Steady	0.0	0.0	649	Steady
Communist (PCC)	Jack Conrad	4	0	Steady	Steady	Steady	0.0	0.0	603	Steady

All parties with more than 500 votes shown. Plaid Cymru result includes votes for Green/Plaid Cymru Alliance.

Government's new majority	21
Total votes cast	33,614,074
Turnout	77.7%

=== 1997 general election ===
1997 United Kingdom general election
		Candidates						Votes		
Party	Leader	Stood	Elected	Gained	Unseated	Net	% of total	%	No.	Net %
Labour	Tony Blair	639 (Note: Includes 26 Co-operative Party candidates, as part of the Labour-Co-op alliance)	418 (Note: Includes 26 Co-operative Party MPs, as part of the Labour-Co-op alliance)	146	0	+145 (Note: Includes +12 Co-operative Party MPs, as part of the Labour-Co-op alliance)	63.4 (Note: Includes 3.9% for the Co-operative Party, as part of the Labour-Co-op alliance)	43.2 (Note: Includes 2.1% for the Co-operative Party, as part of the Labour-Co-op alliance)	13,518,167 (Note: Includes 654,203 for the Co-operative Party, as part of the Labour-Co-op alliance)	+8.8 (Note: Includes +0.6% for the Co-operative Party, as part of the Labour-Co-op alliance)
Conservative	John Major	648	165	0	178	–178	25.0	30.7	9,591,085	–11.2
Liberal Democrats	Paddy Ashdown	639	46	30	2	+28	7.0	16.8	5,242,947	–1.0
Referendum	James Goldsmith	547	0	0	0	0		2.6	811,849	N/A
SNP	Alex Salmond	72	6	3	0	+3	0.9	2.0	621,550	+0.1
UUP	David Trimble	16	10	1	0	+1	1.5	0.8	258,349	0.0
SDLP	John Hume	18	3	0	1	–1	0.5	0.6	190,814	+0.1
Plaid Cymru	Dafydd Wigley	40	4	0	0	0	0.6	0.5	161,030	0.0
Sinn Féin	Gerry Adams	17	2	2	0	+2	0.3	0.4	126,921	0.0
DUP	Ian Paisley	9	2	0	1	–1	0.3	0.3	107,348	0.0
UKIP	Alan Sked	193	0	0	0	0		0.3	105,722	N/A
Independent	N/A	25	1	1	0	+1	0.2	0.2	64,482	0.0
Alliance	John Alderdice	17	0	0	0	0		0.2	62,972	0.0
Green	Peg Alexander and David Taylor	89	0	0	0	0		0.2	61,731	–0.2
Socialist Labour	Arthur Scargill	64	0	0	0	0		0.2	52,109	N/A
Liberal	Michael Meadowcroft	53	0	0	0	0		0.1	45,166	–0.1
BNP	John Tyndall	57	0	0	0	0		0.1	35,832	0.0
Natural Law	Geoffrey Clements	197	0	0	0	0		0.1	30,604	–0.1
Speaker	Betty Boothroyd	1	1	1	0	0		0.1	23,969	
ProLife Alliance	Bruno Quintavalle	56	0	0	0	0		0.1	19,332	N/A
UK Unionist	Robert McCartney	1	1	1	0	+1	0.2	0.0	12,817	N/A
PUP	Hugh Smyth	3	0	0	0	0		0.0	10,928	N/A
National Democrats	Ian Anderson	21	0	0	0	0		0.0	10,829	N/A
Socialist	Peter Taaffe		0	0	0	0		0.0	9,906	N/A
Scottish Socialist	Tommy Sheridan	16	0	0	0	0		0.0	9,740	N/A
Independent	N/A	4	0	0	0	0		0.0	9,233	– 0.1
Ind. Conservative	N/A	4	0	0	0	0		0.0	8,608	–0.1
Monster Raving Loony	Screaming Lord Sutch	24	0	0	0	0		0.0	7,906	–0.1
Make Politicians History	Rainbow George Weiss	29	0	0	0	0		0.0	3,745	N/A
NI Women's Coalition	Monica McWilliams and Pearl Sagar	3	0	0	0	0		0.0	3,024	N/A
Workers' Party	Tom French	8	0	0	0	0		0.0	2,766	–0.1
National Front	John McAuley	6	0	0	0	0		0.0	2,716	N/A
Cannabis Law Reform	Howard Marks	4	0	0	0	0		0.0	2,085	N/A
Socialist People's Party	Jim Hamezian	1	0	0	0	0		0.0	1,995	N/A
Mebyon Kernow	Loveday Jenkin	4	0	0	0	0		0.0	1,906	N/A
Green	Robin Harper	5	0	0	0	0		0.0	1,721	
Conservative Anti-Euro	Christopher Story	1	0	0	0	0		0.0	1,434	N/A
Socialist (GB)	None	5	0	0	0	0		0.0	1,359	N/A
Community Representative	Ralph Knight	1	0	0	0	0		0.0	1,290	N/A
Neighborhood association		1	0	0	0	0		0.0	1,263	N/A
SDP	John Bates	2	0	0	0	0		0.0	1,246	–0.1
Workers Revolutionary	Sheila Torrance	9	0	0	0	0		0.0	1,178	N/A
Real Labour	N/A	1	0	0	0	0		0.0	1,117	N/A
Independent Democrat	N/A		0	0	0	0		0.0	982	
Independent	N/A		0	0	0	0		0.0	890	
Communist	Mike Hicks	3	0	0	0	0		0.0	639	
Independent	N/A	1	0	0	0	0		0.0	593	
Green (NI)		1	0	0	0	0		0.0	539	
Socialist Equality	Davy Hyland	3	0	0	0	0		0.0	505	

All parties with more than 500 votes shown. Labour total includes New Labour and "Labour Time for Change" candidates; Conservative total includes candidates in Northern Ireland (excluded in some lists) and "Loyal Conservative" candidate.

The Popular Unionist MP elected in 1992 died in 1995, and the party folded shortly afterwards.

There was no incumbent Speaker in the 1992 election.

Government's new majority	177
Total votes cast	31,286,284
Turnout	71.3%
