= Shenda Amery =

British painter and sculptor

Shenda Amery is a British painter and sculptor.

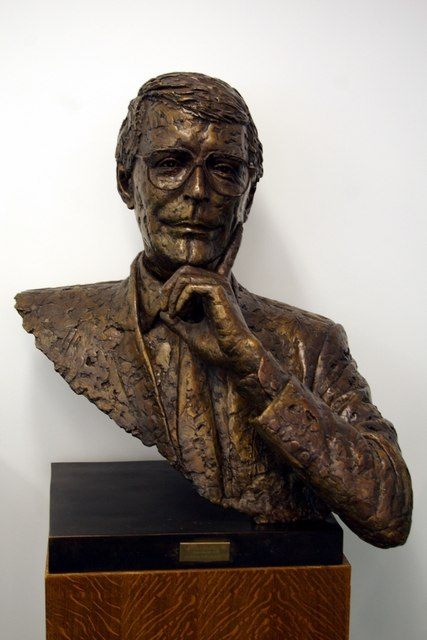
Bust of John Major by Shenda Amery.

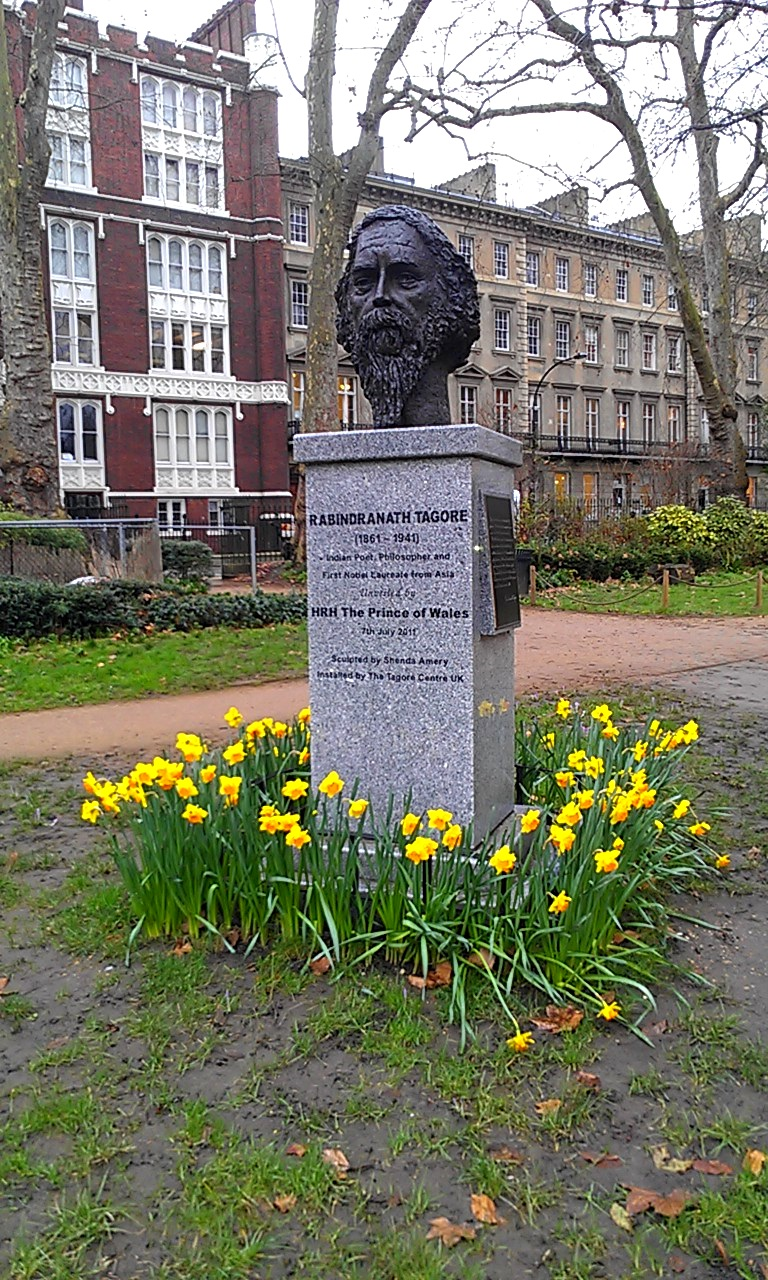
Bust of Rabindranath Tagore in Gordon Square, Bloomsbury, London

== Biography ==
Amery was born in 1937 in London, England, attend the Municipal College in Southend-on-Sea. In 1959 she relocated to Tehran, Iran. She is a member of the Chelsea Art Society, Free Painters and Sculptors, and the Royal Society of Sculptors.

She was married to Nezam Khazal, an Iranian architect.

== Artistic style and career ==
Amery sculpture subjects include the British prime ministers John Major, and Margaret Thatcher as well as King Hussein, and Queen Noor. Additionally, Amery also painted a portrait of British prime ministers Tony Blair which Chequers.

Created from bronze, fibreglass, plastic, and resin, Amery's mixed media works reflect her view of what man is doing to the world and to the environment. Her sculptures and paintings have been interpreted as both figurative and abstract.

Amery has a studio in Chelsea, London and exhibitions of her work including shows at the Royal Society of British women sculptors, Cleveland's Dorman Museum, London's Orangery and at various museums in Iran. She also has auctioned her work off at Dreweatts & Bloomsbury Auctions.
