= John Major =

Prime Minister of the United Kingdom from 1990 to 1997

The Right Honourable Sir John Major KG CH
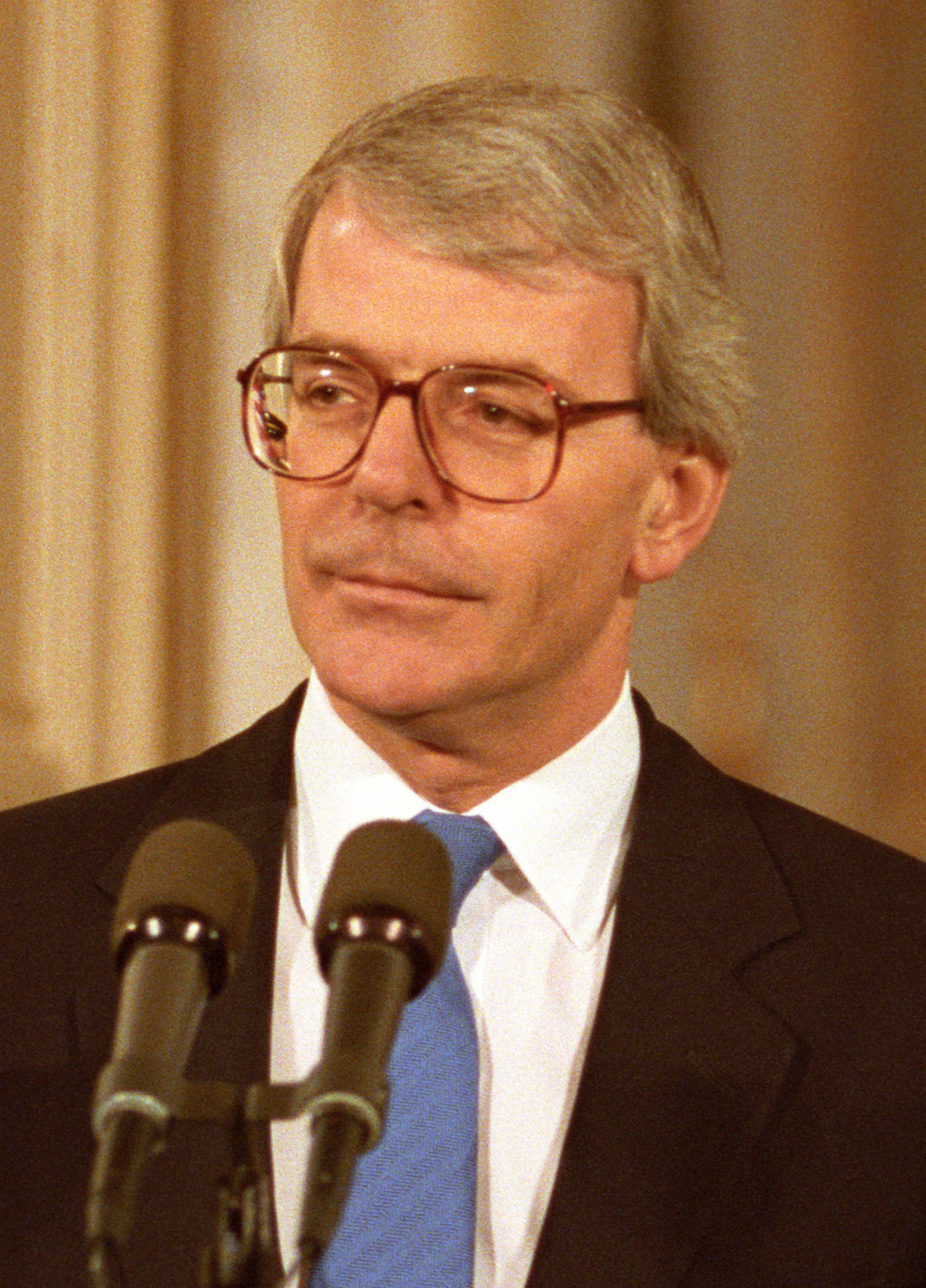
- Major in 1993

Prime Minister of the United Kingdom
- In office 28 November 1990 – 2 May 1997
- Monarch: Elizabeth II
- Deputy: Michael Heseltine (1995‍–‍1997)
- Preceded by: Margaret Thatcher
- Succeeded by: Tony Blair

Leader of the Opposition
- In office 2 May 1997 – 19 June 1997
- Monarch: Elizabeth II
- Prime Minister: Tony Blair
- Deputy: Michael Heseltine
- Preceded by: Tony Blair
- Succeeded by: William Hague

Leader of the Conservative Party
- In office 27 November 1990 – 19 June 1997 (Note: Major resigned as Leader of the Conservative Party on 22 June 1995 to face critics in his party and government, and was re-elected as Leader on 4 July 1995.)
- Deputy: Viscount Whitelaw (1990‍–‍1991)
- Preceded by: Margaret Thatcher
- Succeeded by: William Hague
Ministerial offices
Chancellor of the Exchequer
In office 26 October 1989 – 28 November 1990
Prime Minister	Margaret Thatcher
Preceded by	Nigel Lawson
Succeeded by	Norman Lamont
Foreign Secretary
In office 24 July 1989 – 26 October 1989
Prime Minister	Margaret Thatcher
Preceded by	Geoffrey Howe
Succeeded by	Douglas Hurd
Chief Secretary to the Treasury
In office 13 June 1987 – 24 July 1989
Prime Minister	Margaret Thatcher
Chancellor	Nigel Lawson
Preceded by	John MacGregor
Succeeded by	Norman Lamont
Junior ministerial offices
Minister of State for Social Security
In office 10 September 1986 – 13 June 1987
Prime Minister	Margaret Thatcher
Preceded by	Tony Newton
Succeeded by	Nicholas Scott
Parliamentary Under-Secretary of State for Social Security
In office 2 September 1985 – 10 September 1986
Prime Minister	Margaret Thatcher
Preceded by	John Patten
Succeeded by	Nicholas Lyell
Lord Commissioner of the Treasury
In office 3 October 1984 – 1 November 1985
Prime Minister	Margaret Thatcher
Preceded by	Alastair Goodlad
Succeeded by	Tim Sainsbury
Shadow Cabinet portfolios
Shadow Foreign Secretary
In office 2 May 1997 – 19 June 1997
Leader	Himself
Preceded by	Robin Cook
Succeeded by	Michael Howard
Shadow Secretary of State for Defence
In office 2 May 1997 – 19 June 1997
Leader	Himself
Preceded by	David Clark
Succeeded by	Sir George Young

Member of Parliament for Huntingdon Huntingdonshire (1979–1983)
- In office 3 May 1979 – 14 May 2001
- Preceded by: David Renton
- Succeeded by: Jonathan Djanogly

Personal details
- Born: 29 March 1943 (age 83) St Helier, Surrey, England
- Party: Conservative
- Spouse: Norma Johnson (m. 1970)
- Children: 2
- Parents: Tom Major-Ball (father); Gwendolyn "Gwen" Minny Coates (mother)
- Relatives: Terry Major-Ball (brother)
- Education: Rutlish School
- Nickname: Grey Man
- John Major's voice Major's comments on the 25th anniversary of the Downing Street Declaration; Recorded 11 December 2018

Sir John Major (Note: He was christened "John Roy Major" but only "John Major" was recorded on his birth certificate; he used his middle name until the early 1980s.) (born 29 March 1943) is a British statesman who served as Prime Minister of the United Kingdom and Leader of the Conservative Party from 1990 to 1997. He previously held various Cabinet positions under Margaret Thatcher. Major was the Member of Parliament (MP) for Huntingdon, formerly Huntingdonshire, from 1979 to 2001. Since stepping down, Major has focused on writing and his business, sporting, and charity work, and commentating on political developments.

Major left school before 16, worked as an insurance clerk, joined the Young Conservatives in 1959, and became a highly active member. He was elected to Lambeth London Borough Council in 1968 and, a decade later, to parliament as a Conservative MP at the 1979 general election. Major held junior government positions under Thatcher from 1984 to 1987, including parliamentary private secretary and assistant whip. He served as Chief Secretary to the Treasury from 1987 to 1989, Foreign Secretary in 1989, and Chancellor from 1989 to 1990. Following Thatcher's resignation in 1990, Major stood in the 1990 Conservative leadership election and emerged victorious, becoming prime minister.

Major's more conciliatory political style contrasted with Thatcher's, though much of his policy agenda continued the Thatcherite programme. His government introduced the Citizen's Charter, replaced the poll tax with Council Tax, oversaw Britain's participation in the Gulf War, took charge of the UK's negotiations over the Maastricht Treaty, led the country during the early 1990s economic crisis, withdrew the pound from the European Exchange Rate Mechanism on Black Wednesday, launched the Back to Basics campaign, and oversaw the privatisation of the railways and coal industry. Two years into his premiership, Major led the Conservatives to a fourth consecutive electoral victory, winning more than 14 million votes, which remains the highest total won by a British political party. The struggle to ratify Maastricht deepened Conservative divisions over Europe, and Major's small and later shrinking Commons majority gave dissenting MPs substantial leverage over his government. With Irish taoiseach Albert Reynolds, Major issued the 1993 Downing Street Declaration, which helped establish the basis for the Northern Ireland peace process. In 1995, Major resigned as party leader amid internal divisions over UK membership of the EU, parliamentary scandals and questions over his economic credibility. Despite winning the 1995 leadership election, his government remained unpopular and lost its majority. The Labour Party pulled ahead of the Conservatives in every local election during Major's premiership, and its lead increased after Tony Blair became Labour leader in 1994. The Conservatives were defeated by Labour in a landslide in the 1997 general election, ending 18 years of Conservative government.

After Blair became prime minister, Major served as Leader of the Opposition during the leadership election to replace him, which was won by William Hague. Major remained in the House of Commons as a backbencher, regularly attending and contributing to debates, until he stood down at the 2001 election to focus on writing and his business, sporting and charity work. Major has maintained a low profile, occasionally making political interventions. He supported the unsuccessful Britain Stronger in Europe campaign for the UK to remain in the European Union, and has often criticised Brexit since the 2016 referendum. Major was appointed a Knight Companion of the Order of the Garter (KG) in 2005 for services to politics and charity, and became a member of the Order of the Companions of Honour in 1999 for his work on the Northern Ireland peace process. Major's premiership has generally ranked near the middle of later survey tables: in a 2021 survey of historians and political scientists it placed joint seventh among fourteen completed post-war premierships, while a public Ipsos survey that year placed Major sixth by the proportion saying he had done a good job. Since Thatcher's death in 2013, he has been the oldest living former British prime minister.

== Early life and education (1943–1959) ==
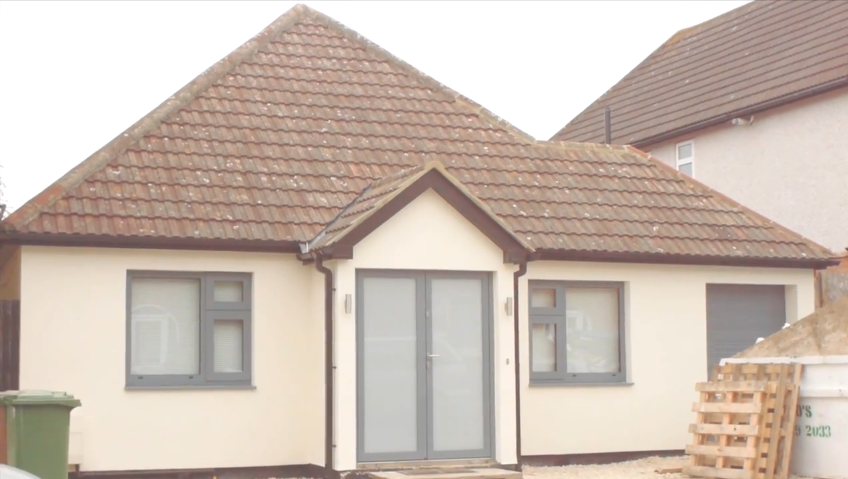
260 Longfellow Road, Worcester Park, where John Major was raised from birth to the age of twelve

John Major was born on 29 March 1943 at St Helier Hospital and Queen Mary's Hospital for Children in St Helier, Surrey, to Gwen Major (née Coates, 1905–1970) and former music hall performer Tom Major-Ball (1879–1962), who was 63 years old when Major was born. He was christened "John Roy Major" but only "John Major" was recorded on his birth certificate; he used his middle name until the early 1980s. His birth had been a difficult one, with his mother suffering from pleurisy and pneumonia and John requiring several blood transfusions due to an infection that caused permanent scarring to his ankles.

The Major family—including John, his parents, and his two older siblings Terry and Pat (Note: John also had two other half-siblings from his father's affairs which he was not to learn of until much later.)—lived at 260 Longfellow Road, Worcester Park, Surrey, a middle-class area where Major's father ran a garden ornaments business and his mother worked in a local library and as a part-time dance teacher. John Major later described the family's circumstances at this time as being "comfortable but not well off". Following a German V-1 flying bomb attack in the area in 1944 which killed several people, the Majors moved to the village of Saham Toney, Norfolk, for the remainder of the war.

John began attending primary school at Cheam Common School from 1948. His childhood was generally happy, and he enjoyed reading, sports (especially cricket and football) and keeping pets, such as his rabbits. In 1954 John passed the 11+ exam, enabling him to go to Rutlish School, a grammar school in Merton Park, though, to John's chagrin, his father insisted that he register as 'John Major-Ball'.

The family's fortunes took a turn for the worse, with his father's health deteriorating (Note: Tom Major had planned to move the family to Canada in his retirement, but his immigration application was rejected due to his failing eyesight.) and the business in severe financial difficulties. A recalled business loan which the family were unable to repay forced Tom Major to sell the house in Worcester Park in May 1955, with the family moving to a cramped, rented top-floor flat at 144 Coldharbour Lane, Brixton. (Note: Major was later to learn that the flat was in fact owned by his half-brother Tom Moss.) With his parents distracted by their reduced circumstances, John's difficulties at Rutlish went unnoticed.

Acutely conscious of his straitened circumstances in relation to the other pupils, Major was something of a loner and consistently under-performed except in sports, especially cricket, coming to see the school as "a penance to be endured". Major left school just before his 16th birthday in 1959 with just three O-level passes in History, English Language and English Literature, to his parents' disappointment. (Note: In the 1999 BBC documentary The Major Years, Major can be seen getting visibly upset when recalling this episode.)

Major's interest in politics stems from this period, and he avidly kept up with current affairs by reading papers on his commutes from Brixton to Wimbledon. In 1956 Major met local MP Marcus Lipton at a local church fair and was invited to watch his first debate in the House of Commons, where Harold Macmillan presented his only Budget as Chancellor of the Exchequer. Major has attributed his political ambitions to this event. Major returned to Brixton during his premiership for the film The Journey, which was made as a party political broadcast during the 1992 general election.

== Early post-school career (1959–1979) ==
Major's first job was as a clerk in the London-based insurance brokerage firm Price Forbes in 1959, but he found the job dull and offering no prospects and eventually quit. Major began working with his brother Terry at the garden ornaments business; this had been sold in 1959, enabling the family to move to a larger residence at 80 Burton Road, Brixton. Major's father died on 27 March 1962. John left the ornaments business the following year to care for his ill mother, though when she got better he was unable to find a new job and was unemployed for much of the latter half of 1962, a situation he says was "degrading".

After Major became prime minister, it was misreported that his failure to get a job as a bus conductor resulted from his failing to pass a maths test; he had in fact passed all of the necessary tests but had been passed over owing to his height. In the meantime he studied for a qualification in banking via a correspondence course. Eventually in December 1962 he found a job working at the London Electricity Board (LEB) in Elephant and Castle.

In 1959, Major had joined the Young Conservatives in Brixton. He soon became a highly active member; this helped increase his confidence following the failure of his school days. Encouraged by fellow Conservative Derek Stone, he started giving speeches on a soap-box in Brixton Market. According to his biographer Anthony Seldon, Major brought "youthful exuberance" to the Tories in Brixton, but was sometimes in trouble with the professional agent Marion Standing. At the age of 21, Major was a candidate to become a councillor for Larkhall ward at the 1964 Lambeth London Borough Council election, but lost to Labour.

He also assisted local Conservative candidates Kenneth Payne in the 1964 general election and Piers Dixon in the 1966 general election. Another formative influence on Major in this period was Jean Kierans, a divorcée 13 years his elder with two children who lived opposite the family on Burton Road, who became his mentor and lover. Seldon writes, "She ... made Major smarten his appearance, groomed him politically, and made him more ambitious and worldly." Major later moved in with Kierans when his family left Burton Road in 1965; their relationship lasted from 1963 to sometime after 1968.

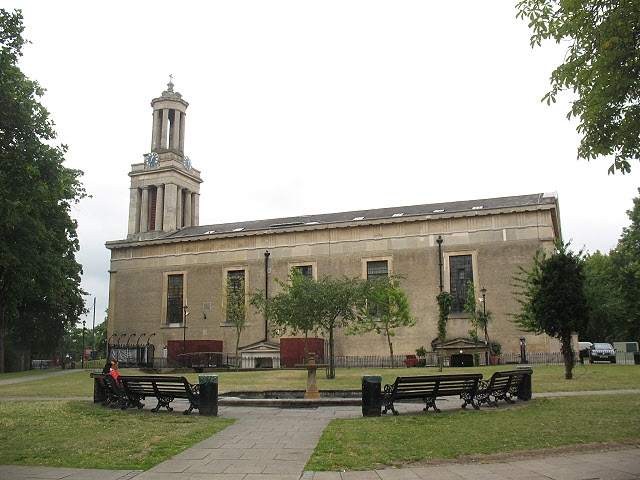
St Matthew's Church, Brixton, where John and Norma Major married in 1970

In May 1965, Major left the LEB and took up a post at District Bank, though he soon left this to join Standard Bank the following year, largely because the latter offered the chance to work abroad. In December 1966 he was sent on a long secondment to Jos, Nigeria, which he enjoyed immensely, though he was put off by the casual racism of some of the ex-pat workers there. In May 1967 he was involved in a serious car crash in which he broke a leg and had to be flown home. Leaving hospital, he split his time between Jean Kierans' house and a small rented flat in Mayfair, working at Standard Bank's London office and resuming his banking diploma and activities with the Young Conservatives in his spare time.

In the 1968 Lambeth London Borough Council election, Major stood again as a councillor, this time for Ferndale ward. Though a Labour stronghold, the Conservatives received a huge boost following Enoch Powell's anti-immigration 'Rivers of Blood speech' in April 1968 and Major won, despite strongly disapproving of Powell's views. Major took a major interest in housing matters, with Lambeth notorious for overcrowding and poor-quality rented accommodation. In February 1970 Major became Chairman of the Housing Committee, being responsible for overseeing the building of several large council estates. (Note: Major was later to express regret for his support for large-scale tower block estates. In April 1992 Labour-run Lambeth Council rebuffed plans for a plaque commemorating Major in the borough, stating that there was already "sufficient monument to John Major in the form of the Stockwell Park and Moorlands Estates".) He also promoted more openness at the council, initiating a series of public meetings with local residents. Major also undertook fact-finding trips to the Netherlands, Finland and the Soviet Union. Despite the Lambeth housing team being well-regarded nationally, Major lost his seat in the 1971 Lambeth London Borough Council election.

In April 1970, Major met Norma Johnson at a Conservative Party event in Brixton, and the two became engaged shortly thereafter, marrying at St Matthew's Church in Brixton on 3 October 1970. John's mother died shortly before the marriage, in September, at the age of 65. John and Norma moved into a flat at Primrose Court, Streatham, which John had bought in 1969, and had their first child, Elizabeth, in November 1971. In 1974 the couple moved to a larger residence at West Oak, Beckenham, and had a second child, James, in January 1975. Meanwhile, Major continued to work at Standard Bank (renamed Standard Chartered from 1975), having completed his banking diploma in 1972. Major was promoted to head of the PR department in August 1976, and his duties necessitated the occasional foreign trip to East Asia.

Despite his setback at the 1971 Lambeth Council election, Major continued to nurse political ambitions, and with help from friends in the Conservative Party, managed to get onto the Conservative Central Office's list of potential MP candidates. Major was selected as the Conservative candidate for the Labour-dominated St Pancras North constituency, fighting both the February and October 1974 general elections, losing heavily both times to Labour's Albert Stallard. Major then attempted to get selected as a candidate for a more promising seat and, despite numerous attempts, was unsuccessful until December 1976.

Growing increasingly frustrated, Major resolved to make one last attempt, applying for selection to the safe Conservative seat of Huntingdonshire and finally he succeeded. Major was in some ways an odd choice, being a born-and-bred Londoner in a largely rural constituency still home to many landed families; however, he was seen as being the most likely to win over the increasingly large numbers of upwardly mobile London overspill families living in the area, and local MP David Renton helped to familiarise him with the area.

In 1977, the Major family purchased a house at De Vere Close in the village of Hemingford Grey. Major took on a less demanding job at Standard Chartered and started working part-time in 1978 so that he could devote more time to his constituency duties.

== Early parliamentary career (1979–1987) ==
In the 1979 general election, which brought the Conservatives led by Margaret Thatcher to power, Major won the Huntingdon seat by a large margin. He made his maiden speech in the House of Commons on 13 June 1979, voicing his support for the government's budget. Major assiduously courted contacts at all levels of the party in this period, joining the informal 'Guy Fawkes club' of Conservative MPs and attending various committees. He became Secretary of the Environment Committee and also assisted with work on the Housing Act 1980, which allowed council house tenants the Right to Buy their homes. At this time Major lived in De Vere Close, Hemingford Grey.

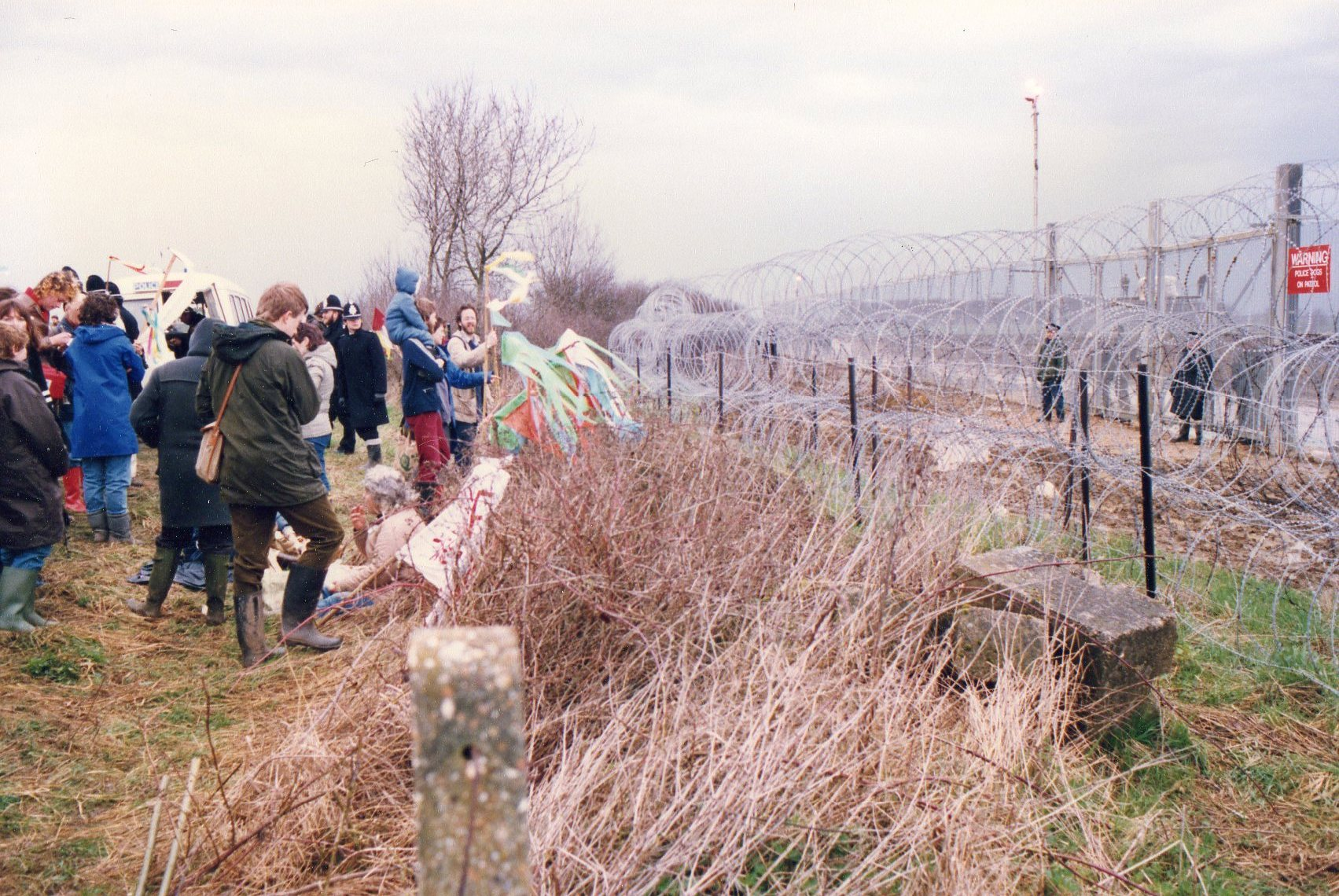
A demonstration against the deployment of cruise missiles at RAF Molesworth in the early 1980s

Major's first promotion came when he was appointed as a Parliamentary private secretary in January 1981 to Patrick Mayhew and Timothy Raison, both Ministers of State at the Home Office. Seeking to gain more exposure to foreign affairs, he joined several Labour Party MPs on a fact-finding trip to the Middle East in April 1982. The group met with King Hussein of Jordan and Yasser Arafat of the Palestine Liberation Organization in Lebanon; in Israel they were briefly caught in the middle of a shooting incident between Israeli troops and a Palestinian rock-thrower.

Major later became an assistant whip in January 1983, responsible for East Anglian MPs. During this period Major also became involved in the response to protests at RAF Molesworth, which lay in his constituency; various peace groups were opposed to the siting of cruise missiles at the base and had established a permanent 'peace camp' there. Major addressed public meetings opposed to the protesters, organised by parish councillors, and also met Bill Westwood and separately Michael Heseltine to discuss the issue. The protesters were evicted in February 1984.

Major comfortably won re-election to the now slightly enlarged seat of Huntingdon at the 1983 general election. Shortly thereafter he and Norma moved to a larger house (Finings) in Great Stukeley; Major generally spent his weekends there, and weekdays at a rented flat in Durand Gardens, Stockwell. Major was invited to join the prestigious 'Blue Chip' group of rising stars in the Conservative Party, and he was promoted to Treasury Whip in October 1984. In 2002, it was revealed that during this period Major had conducted an affair with Edwina Currie, a Conservative backbencher and later Parliamentary Under-Secretary of State, Health and Social Security; the affair ended in 1988. Major narrowly avoided the IRA's Brighton hotel bombing in October 1984, having left the hotel only a few hours before the bomb went off. Also in this period, Major stood in for a Foreign Office minister on a trip to South America, visiting Colombia, Peru and Venezuela.

In September 1985, Major was made Parliamentary under-secretary of state for the Department of Health and Social Security (DHSS), before being promoted to become Minister of State in the same department in September 1986. The large size of the DHSS granted Ministers a greater degree of responsibility than in other departments, (Note: The department was later split into two separate ministries for Health and Social Security in 1988.) with Major assisting with work on the Social Security Act 1986 and improving provision for disabled people. Major began to gain a bigger profile, giving his first speech at the Conservative Party Conference in October 1986. He first attracted major national media attention in January 1987 over cold weather payments to the elderly, when Britain was in the depths of a severe winter. Amidst intense media criticism, Major discussed the issue with Margaret Thatcher and an increase in the payments was approved.

== In Cabinet (1987–1990) ==
=== Chief Secretary to the Treasury (1987–1989) ===
Following the 1987 general election, in which Major retained his seat with an increased majority, he was promoted to the Cabinet as Chief Secretary to the Treasury, making him the first MP of the 1979 intake to reach the Cabinet. (Note: Major was also appointed to the Privy Council at this time.) The then-Chancellor Nigel Lawson generally made significant decisions with little input from others, and Major was put in charge of agreeing departmental budgets with the Secretaries of State. These discussions went well, and for the first time in several years budgets were agreed without recourse to the external adjudication of the so-called 'Star Chamber'. Major successfully concluded a second round of such spending reviews in July 1988.

Whilst Chief Secretary, Major took part in discussions over the future funding of the NHS, against the background of an NHS strike over pay in February 1988. The discussions resulted in the 'Working for Patients' white paper and subsequent National Health Service and Community Care Act 1990. Major also insisted, in discussions with Thatcher, that government assistance should be provided to support the sale of Short Brothers to Bombardier, an aerospace company and major employer in Northern Ireland which might otherwise have collapsed.

=== Foreign Secretary (July–October 1989) ===
In 1987–1988, it became clear that Major had become a 'favourite' of Thatcher's and he was widely tipped for further promotion. Nevertheless, Major's appointment as Foreign Secretary in July 1989 came as a surprise due to his relative lack of experience in the Cabinet and unfamiliarity with international affairs. Major found the prospect daunting, and unsuccessfully attempted to convince Thatcher to allow him to stay on at the Treasury. There were also fears within the Foreign & Commonwealth Office (FCO) that Major would be Thatcher's 'hatchet-man', as her relations with the department under Geoffrey Howe had been poor and characterised by mutual distrust. Major accepted the job and began to settle into the department, living in an upstairs room at the FCO and devolving decision-making where necessary, though he found the increased security burdensome and disliked the extensive ceremonial aspects of the role.

Amongst Major's first acts as Foreign Secretary was to cancel the sale of Hawk aircraft to Iraq, over concerns they would be used for internal repression. He represented Britain at the Paris Peace Conference to determine the future of Cambodia. Major also met with US secretary of state James Baker, with whom he primarily discussed the issue of Vietnamese boat people, and with Qian Qichen, Foreign Minister of China, becoming the first senior Western politician to meet with a Chinese official since the violent crackdown on pro-democracy protesters in Tiananmen Square the previous month. Discussions focused primarily on the future of Hong Kong, which Britain was scheduled to hand over to China in 1997.

Major spent most of a summer holiday that year in Spain conducting extensive background reading on foreign affairs and British foreign policy. Upon his return to the UK he and Thatcher met with French president François Mitterrand to discuss the future direction of the European Community. In September 1989, Major delivered a speech at the United Nations General Assembly, in which he pledged to support Colombia's effort to tackle the drugs trade and reiterated Britain's opposition to the apartheid regime in South Africa. Major also met US president George H. W. Bush in Washington, D.C. His meeting with Domingo Cavallo, the Argentine foreign minister, was the first such meeting since the end of the Falklands War seven years earlier.

Major's last major summit as Foreign Secretary was the Commonwealth Heads of Government Meeting (CHOGM) in Malaysia. The meeting was dominated by the issue of sanctions on South Africa, with Britain being the only country to oppose them, on the grounds that they would end up hurting poorer South Africans far more than the apartheid regime at which they were aimed. The summit ended acrimoniously, with Thatcher controversially and against established precedent issuing a second final communiqué stating Britain's opposition to sanctions, with the press seizing on the apparent disagreement on the matter between Major and Thatcher.

=== Chancellor of the Exchequer (1989–1990) ===
After just three months as Foreign Secretary, Major was appointed Chancellor of the Exchequer on 26 October 1989 following the sudden resignation of Nigel Lawson, who had fallen out with Thatcher over what he saw as her excessive reliance on the advice of her Economic Adviser Alan Walters. (Note: Walters resigned soon after.) The appointment meant that, despite only being in the Cabinet for a little over two years, Major had gone from the most junior position in the Cabinet to holding two of the Great Offices of State. Major made tackling inflation a priority, stating that tough measures were needed to bring it down and that "if it isn't hurting, it isn't working." He delivered his first Autumn Statement on 15 November, announcing a boost in spending (mainly for the NHS) and stating that interest rates would remain unchanged.

As Chancellor, Major presented only one Budget, the first to be televised live, on 20 March 1990. He publicised it as a 'budget for savers', with the creation of the tax-exempt special savings account (TESSA), arguing that measures were required to address the marked fall in the household savings ratio that had been apparent during the previous financial year. Major also abolished the composite rate tax and stamp duty on share trades, whilst increasing taxes on alcohol, cigarettes and petrol. Tax cuts were also made which benefited football associations, the aim being to increase funding for safety measures following the Bradford City stadium fire and Hillsborough disaster. Extra funding was also made available to Scotland in order to limit the impact of the Community Charge (widely dubbed the 'Poll Tax'), which had been introduced there that year.

The European Community's push for full Economic and Monetary Union (EMU) was another important factor in Major's time as Chancellor; in June 1990 he proposed that instead of a single European currency there could be a 'hard ECU', (Note: The European Currency Unit was a notional unit of account based on a weighted 'basket' of major European currencies. It was replaced with the physical Euro currency in 1999.) against which different national currencies could compete and which, if the ECU was successful, could lead to a single currency. The move was seen as a wrecking tactic by France and Germany, especially when the increasingly Euro-sceptic Thatcher announced her outright opposition to EMU, and the idea was abandoned. More successfully, Major managed to get the new European Bank for Reconstruction and Development (EBRD) located in London.

By early 1990, entry into the European Exchange Rate Mechanism (ERM) was increasingly seen within government as a means of combating inflation and restoring macroeconomic stability. Major and Douglas Hurd (Major's successor as Foreign Secretary) set about trying to convince a reluctant Thatcher to join it. The move was supported by the Bank of England, the Treasury, most of the Cabinet, the Labour Party, several major business associations and much of the press. With the 'Lawson Boom' showing signs of running out of steam, exacerbated by rising oil prices following Iraq's invasion of Kuwait in August 1990, there were fears of a potential recession and pressure to cut interest rates. Thatcher finally agreed on 4 October, and Britain's entry into the ERM at a rate of DM 2.95 to £1.00 (with an agreed 6% floating 'band' either side) was announced the following day. An interest rate cut of 1% (from 15%) was also announced on the same day.

The rest of Major's Chancellorship prior to the leadership contest was largely uneventful; he considered granting the Bank of England operational independence over monetary policy, with the ability to set interest rates, but decided against it. (Note: This was later enacted under Labour Chancellor Gordon Brown in 1998.) He also agreed a restructuring and write-off of some Third World debt at a Commonwealth Finance Ministers meeting in Trinidad and Tobago in September 1990.

=== 1990 Conservative Party leadership election ===
Opposition within the Conservative Party to Margaret Thatcher had been brewing for some time, focusing on what was seen as her brusque, imperious style and the poll tax, which was facing serious opposition across the country. In December 1989, she had survived a leadership bid by Anthony Meyer; though she won easily, 60 MPs had not voted for her, and it was rumoured that many more had had to be strong-armed into supporting her. By early 1990, it was clear that bills for many under the new poll tax regime would be higher than anticipated, and opposition to the tax grew, with a non-payment campaign gaining much support and an anti-poll tax demonstration in Trafalgar Square in March ending in rioting. The Conservatives lost the 1990 Mid Staffordshire by-election to Labour and the 1990 Eastbourne by-election to the Liberal Democrats, both Conservative seats, causing many Conservative MPs to worry about their prospects at the upcoming general election, due in 1991 or 1992. Thatcher's staunch anti-European stance also alienated pro-Europe Conservatives. On 1 November, the pro-European deputy prime minister Geoffrey Howe resigned, issuing a fiercely critical broadside against Thatcher in the House of Commons on 13 November.

The day after Howe's speech Michael Heseltine, Thatcher's former Secretary of State for Defence who had acrimoniously resigned in 1986 over the Westland affair, challenged Thatcher for the leadership of the Conservative Party. Both John Major and Foreign Secretary Douglas Hurd supported Thatcher in the first round. Major was at home in Huntingdon recovering from a pre-arranged wisdom tooth operation during the first leadership ballot, which Thatcher won but not by the required threshold, necessitating a second round. Following discussions with her cabinet, in which many stated that, though supporting her, they doubted she could win, Thatcher withdrew from the contest and announced that she would resign as prime minister once a new leader had been elected. Major subsequently announced on 22 November that he would stand in the second ballot, with Thatcher's backing. Major's platform was one of moderation on Europe, a review of the poll tax, and the desire to build a "classless society".

Unlike in the first ballot, a candidate only required a simple majority of Conservative MPs to win, in this case 187 of 372 MPs. The ballot was held on the afternoon of 27 November; although Major obtained 185 votes, 2 votes short of an overall majority, he polled far enough ahead of both Hurd and Heseltine to secure their immediate withdrawal. With no remaining challengers, Major was formally named Leader of the Conservative Party that evening and was duly appointed prime minister the following day. At 47, he was the youngest prime minister since Lord Rosebery some 95 years earlier.

== Prime Minister (1990–1997) ==
=== First Major ministry (1990–1992) ===
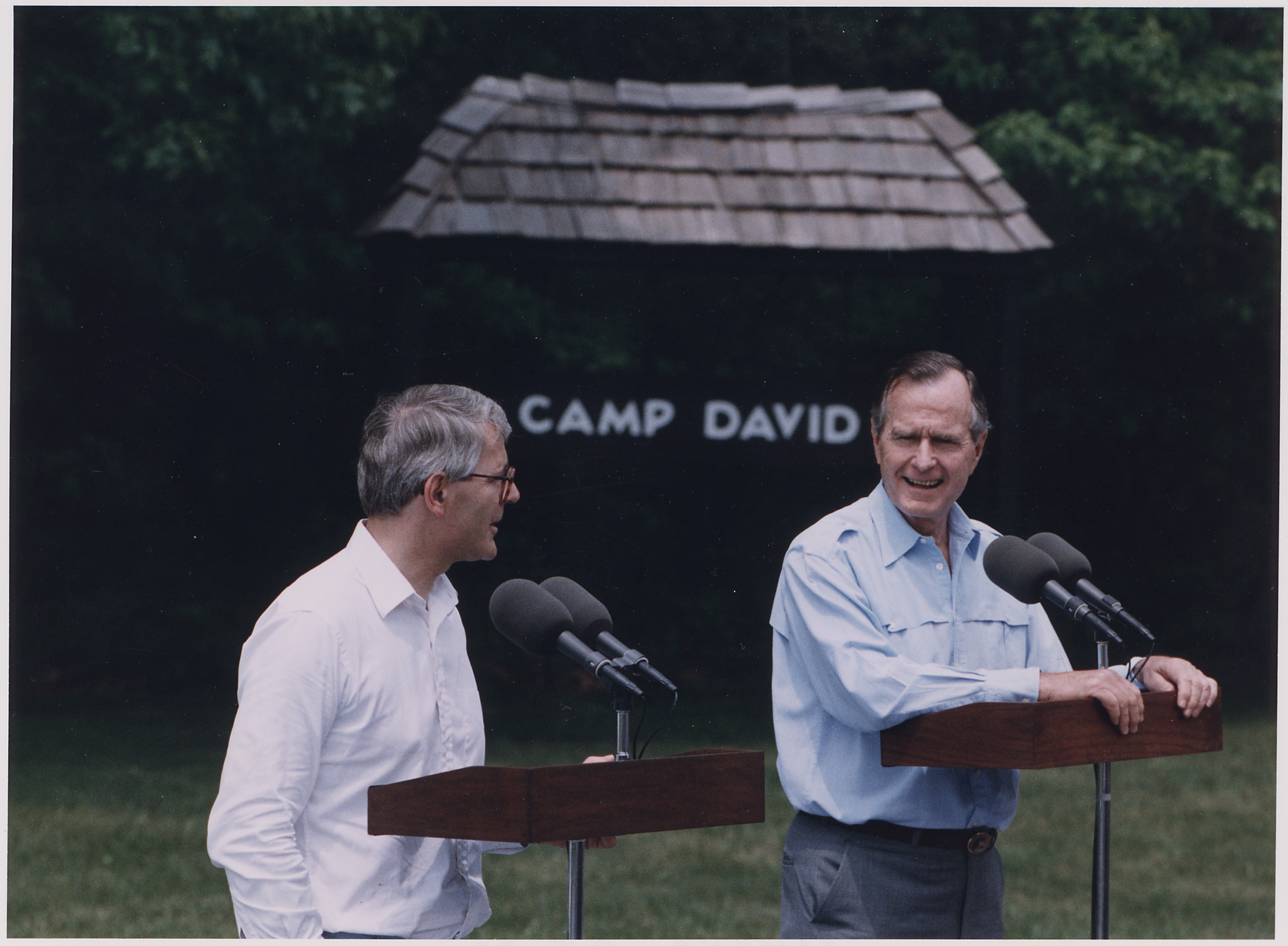
Prime Minister John Major and President George H. W. Bush participate in a press availability at Camp David

Major became prime minister on 28 November 1990 when he accepted the Queen's invitation to form a government, succeeding Margaret Thatcher. He inherited a majority government from Thatcher, who had been the prime minister for the previous eleven years. The Conservatives' popularity was low, with some polling showing Labour's Neil Kinnock with a 23% lead over the Tories in April 1990 following the introduction of the Community Charge (poll tax). By the time of Major's appointment, Labour's lead had shrunk to 14%. Major's accession produced an immediate Conservative recovery in the polls, but it proved short-lived.

Major's first ministry was dominated by the early 1990s recession, amid high interest rates, falling house prices and an overvalued exchange rate. The high interest rates led to more saving, less spending and less investment in the UK's sectors. Falling house prices stalled construction in the housing sector. Economic growth was not re-established until early 1993. By November 1991, unemployment was at 2.5 million (compared to 1.6 million 18 months earlier).

In March 1991 the government announced that the poll tax would be abolished. Council tax, under which household bills were based mainly on property-value bands, took effect on 1 April 1993. In July 1991 Major launched the Citizen's Charter. The programme's service-specific charters published standards and performance measures and set out procedures for complaints and redress.

Major oversaw Britain's participation in the Gulf War, the UN-authorised campaign to remove Iraqi forces from Kuwait. Britain supplied the second-largest contingent in the 39-country coalition; Operation Granby was its largest military deployment since the Second World War.

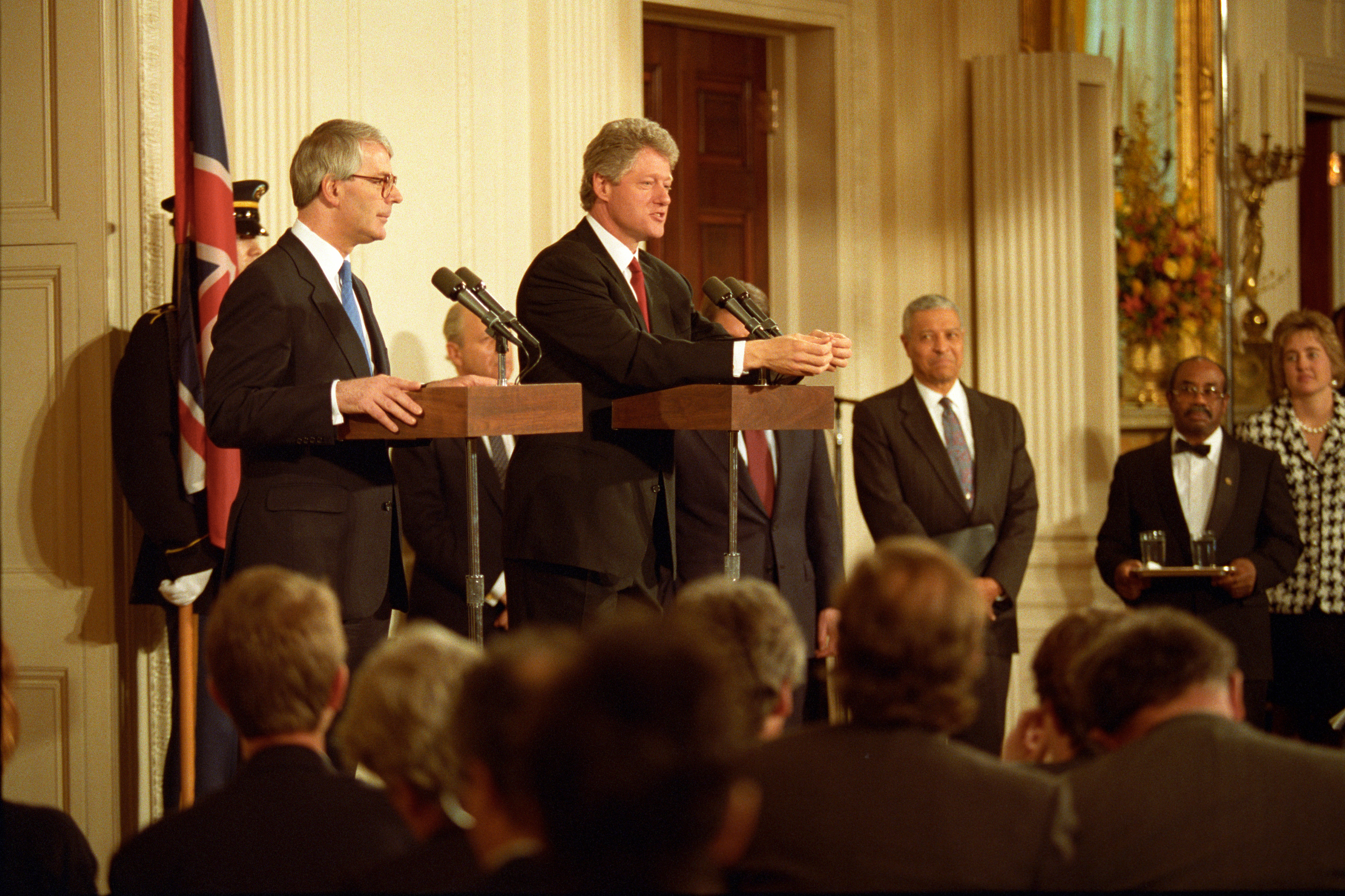
Prime Minister John Major and President Bill Clinton deliver press statements at the White House in 1993

On 10 March 1992, Chancellor of the Exchequer Norman Lamont delivered his budget speech in the House of Commons. It included tax cuts ahead of the forthcoming general election. The next day, Major called an election for 9 April. To the surprise of many pollsters, the Conservatives won a majority at the 9 April election, with 336 seats, and earned 41.9% of the vote. With a high turnout, the Conservatives earned over 14 million votes, which remains a record in any UK general election. This was the Conservatives' fourth consecutive election victory. Kinnock was replaced by John Smith as Labour leader and Leader of the Opposition in July 1992.

=== Second Major ministry (1992–1997) ===
On 16 September 1992, sterling was forced out of the European Exchange Rate Mechanism after the government intervened heavily to defend it and announced successive interest-rate increases from 10 to 12 and then 15 per cent; the latter never took effect. The event became known as Black Wednesday and became a catalyst for Conservative divisions and a more vigorous Euroscepticism. Although the recession ended in 1993, Conservative support did not recover. Major's second ministry was also defined by conflicts within the Conservative Party over Europe during ratification of the Maastricht Treaty. The struggle to ratify Maastricht deepened Conservative divisions over Europe, and Major's small and later shrinking Commons majority gave dissenting MPs substantial leverage over his government.

In December 1993, Major and the Irish taoiseach, Albert Reynolds, issued the Downing Street Declaration, which made majority consent central to any change in Northern Ireland's constitutional status and offered parties committed to peaceful methods a route into negotiations. It helped establish the basis for the Northern Ireland peace process. The IRA announced a ceasefire in August 1994, followed by loyalist paramilitaries in October.

The Railways Act 1993 broke up British Rail's integrated system into separate infrastructure, rolling-stock and train-operating businesses; passenger services were divided among 25 franchises. The government also privatised British Coal's core mining assets at the end of 1994.

Major launched Back to Basics in 1993 as a broad appeal spanning education, public services, industry and law and order, but its association with traditional morality made it a liability amid later Conservative scandals.

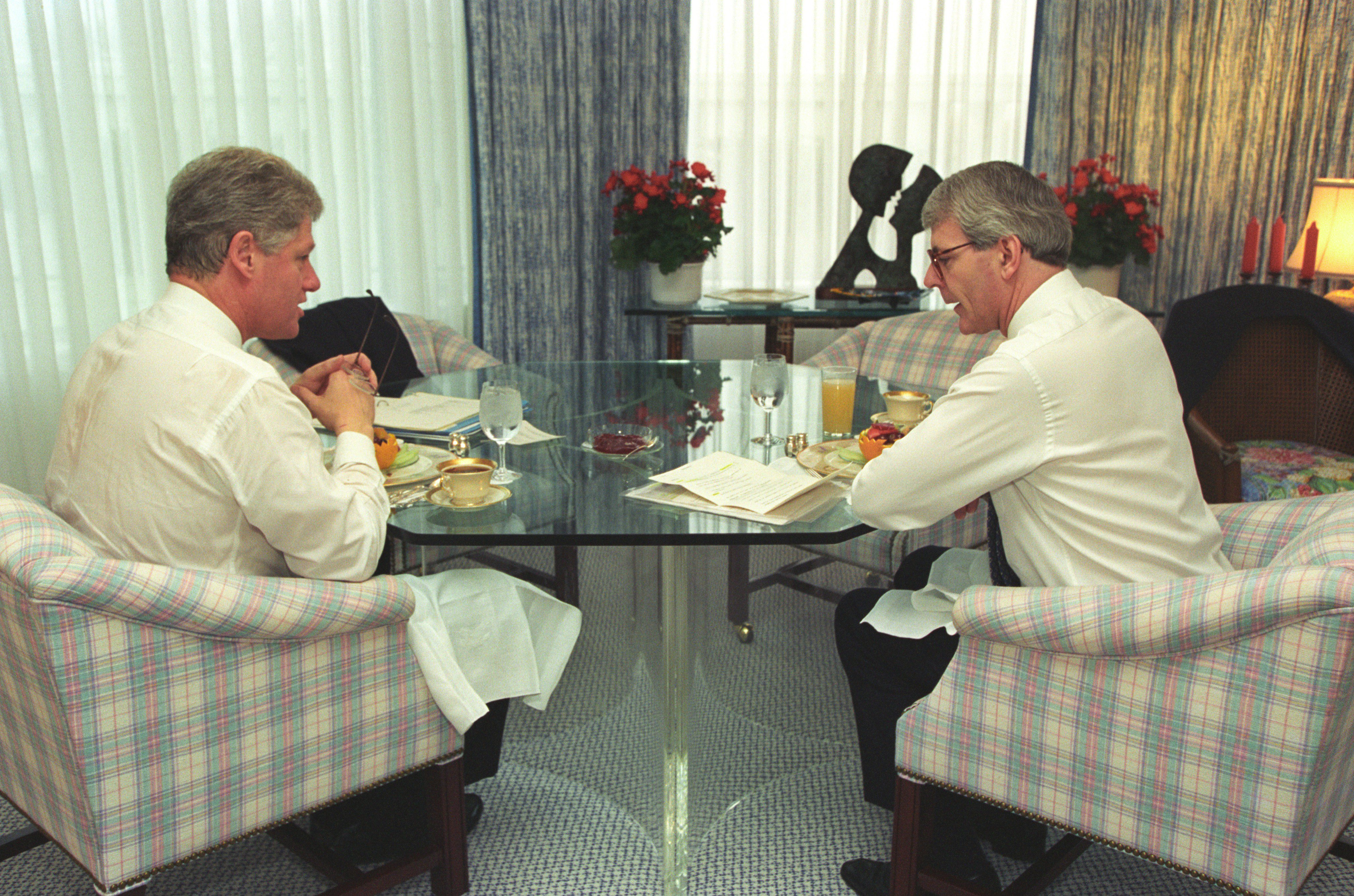
Major and Clinton at the White House in 1994

On 12 May 1994, John Smith died from a heart attack and was replaced by Tony Blair, who continued Labour's modernisation under the slogan of "New Labour". Polling in late 1994 and early 1995 showed a commanding Labour lead. The Conservatives remained divided during this period. Major resigned as party leader and stood for re-election in the resulting leadership election, held on 4 July 1995, in which he comfortably beat John Redwood. Following a string of by-election defeats, the Conservatives had lost their majority by 13 December 1996.

In the 1997 election, Labour won 418 seats in a landslide, ending eighteen years of Conservative government. The Conservatives won 165 seats and 30.7 per cent of the vote—at the time, their fewest seats since 1906 and lowest vote share since 1832—and won no seats in Scotland or Wales. The party suffered a larger defeat in the 2024 election. On the morning of 2 May 1997, on his final departure from Downing Street to offer his resignation to Queen Elizabeth II, Major announced his intention to step down as leader of the Conservative Party, stating in his exit speech that "when the curtain falls it is time to get off the stage". He was succeeded as prime minister by Tony Blair.

== Final years in Parliament (1997–2001) ==
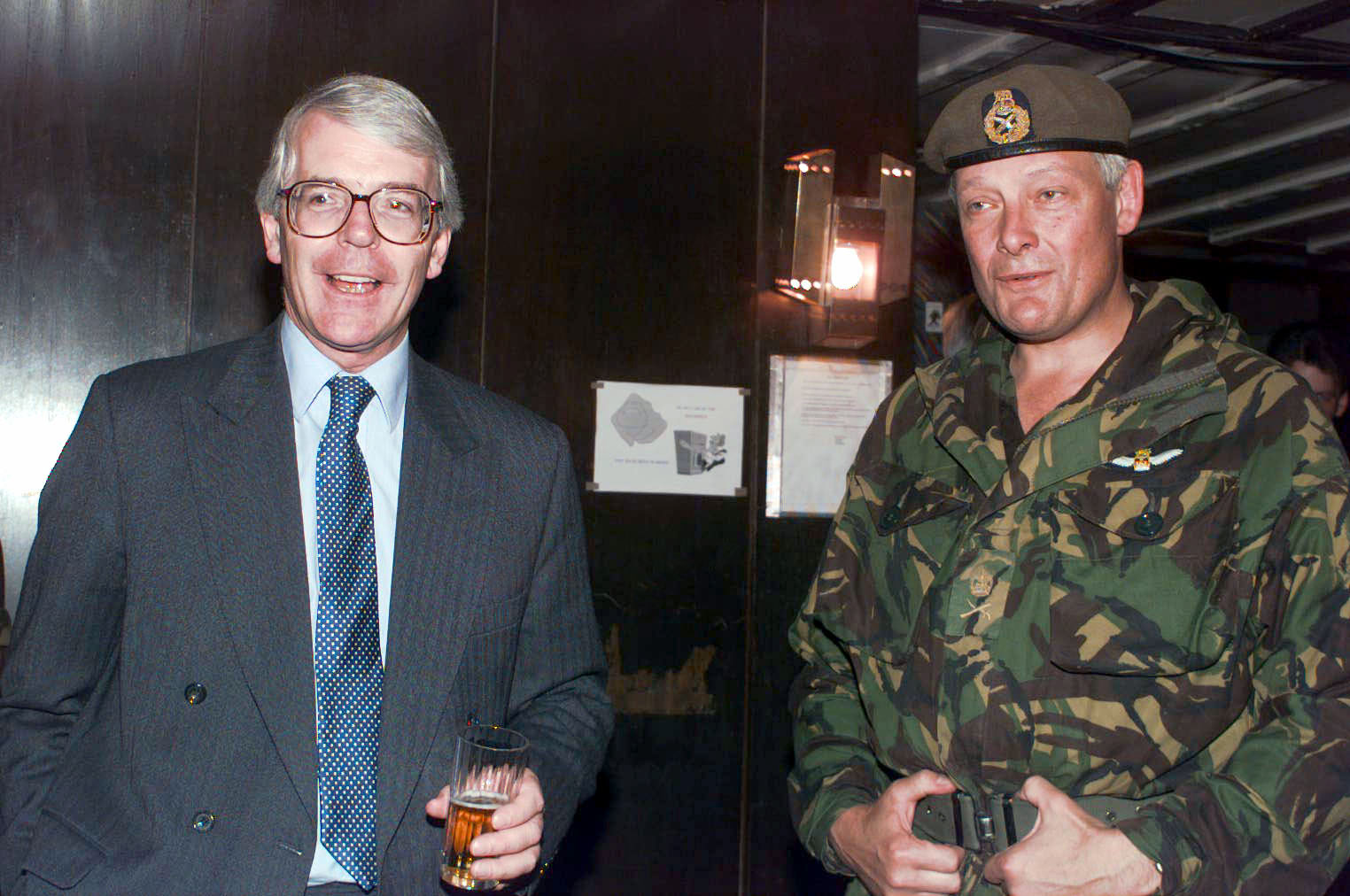
Major talks with Lieutenant General Michael Walker in 1996

Speculation over Major's leadership had continued since his re-election in 1995, and intensified as it became increasingly likely that the Conservatives would suffer a landslide defeat in the upcoming general election. During this period, Michael Portillo had frequently been touted as the favourite to replace Major, but lost his seat in the election, thus eliminating him from the running. Although many Conservative MPs wanted Major to resign as leader immediately because of the 1997 election loss, there was a movement among the grassroots of the party, encouraged by his political allies, to have him stay on as leader until the autumn. Lord Cranborne, his chief of staff during the election, and the chief whip, Alastair Goodlad, both pleaded with him to stay on: they argued that remaining as leader for a few months would give the party time to come to terms with the scale of defeat before electing a successor. Major refused, saying: "It would be terrible, because I would be presiding with no authority over a number of candidates fighting for the crown. It would merely prolong the agony."

Major served as Leader of the Opposition for seven weeks while the leadership election to replace him was underway. He formed a temporary Shadow Cabinet, but with seven of his Cabinet ministers having lost their seats at the election, and with few senior MPs left to replace them, several MPs had to hold multiple briefs. Major himself served as shadow foreign secretary (having served as foreign secretary for three months in 1989) and Shadow Secretary of State for Defence, and the office of Shadow Secretary of State for Scotland was left vacant until after the 2001 general election as the party no longer had any Scottish MPs. Major's resignation as Conservative leader formally took effect on 19 June 1997 after the election of William Hague.

Major's Resignation Honours were announced on 1 August 1997. He remained active in Parliament, regularly attending and contributing to debates. He stood down from the House of Commons at the 2001 general election, having announced his retirement from Parliament on 10 March 2000. Jonathan Djanogly took over as MP for Huntingdon, retaining the seat for the Conservatives at the 2001 election.

Like some post-war former prime ministers (such as Edward Heath), Major turned down a peerage when he retired from the House of Commons in 2001. He said that he wanted a "firebreak from politics" and to focus on writing and his business, sporting and charity work.

== Post-parliamentary life (2001–present) ==
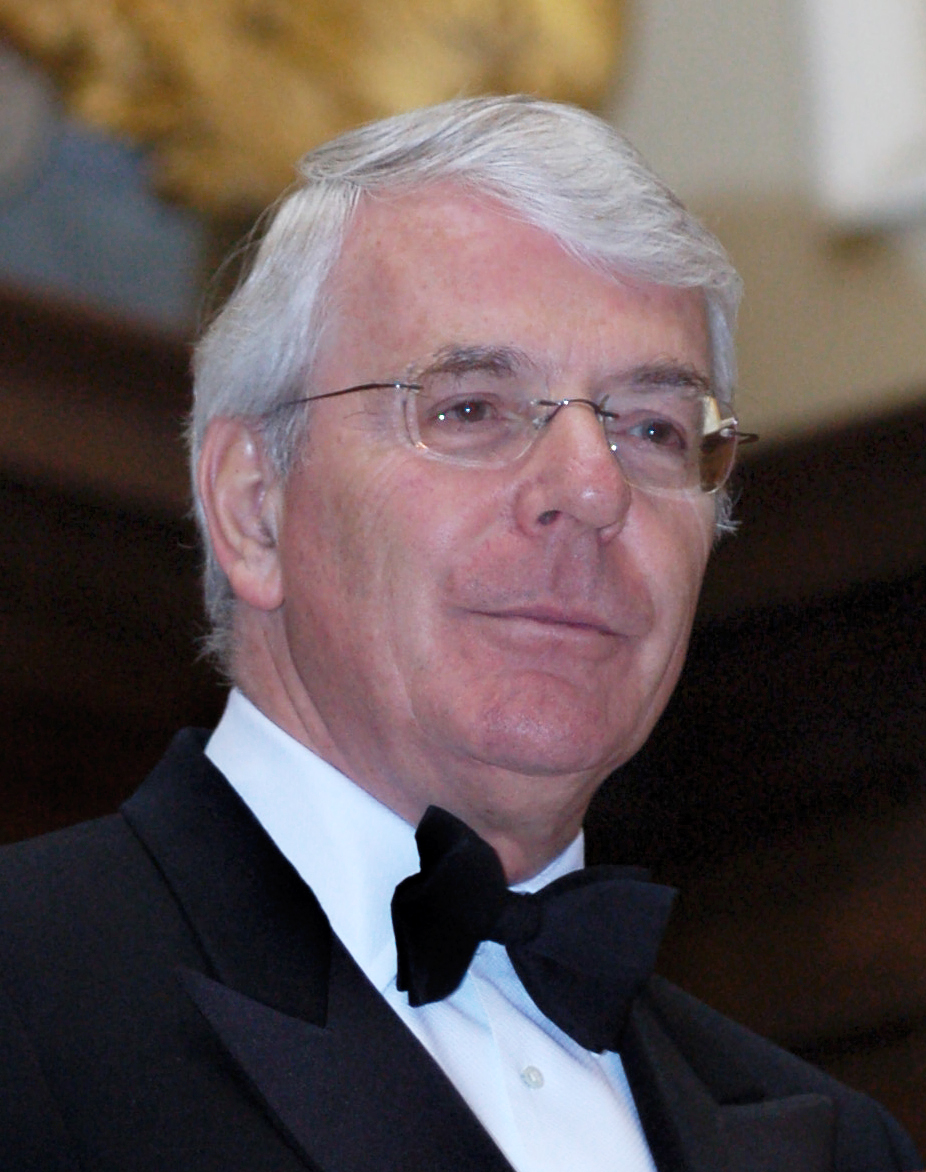
Major at The Hist in Dublin, 2007

Since leaving office, Major has tended to maintain a low profile in the media, occasionally commentating on political developments in the role of an elder statesman. In 1999 he published an autobiography covering his early life and time in office; it was generally well received. Major went on to write a book about the history of cricket in 2007 (More Than a Game: The Story of Cricket's Early Years) and a book about music hall (My Old Man: A Personal History of Music Hall) in 2012.

Major has further explored his love of cricket as President of Surrey County Cricket Club from 2000 to 2001 (and Honorary Life Vice-president since 2002). In March 2001 he paid tribute to cricketer Colin Cowdrey at his memorial service in Westminster Abbey. In 2005 he was elected to the Committee of the Marylebone Cricket Club, historically the governing body of the sport and still the guardian of the laws of the game. Major left the committee in 2011, citing concerns with the planned redevelopment of Lord's Cricket Ground.

John Major has also been actively engaged in charity work, being President of Asthma UK, and a Patron of the Prostate Cancer Charity, Sightsavers UK, Mercy Ships, Support for Africa 2000, Afghan Heroes, and Consortium for Street Children. In February 2012, Major became chairman of the Queen Elizabeth Diamond Jubilee Trust, which was formed as part of the Diamond Jubilee of Elizabeth II and is intended to support charitable organisations and projects across the Commonwealth, focusing on areas such as cures for diseases and the promotion of culture and education. Major was a Patron of the sight loss and learning disability charity SeeAbility from 2006 to 2012 and has been a vice-president since 2013.

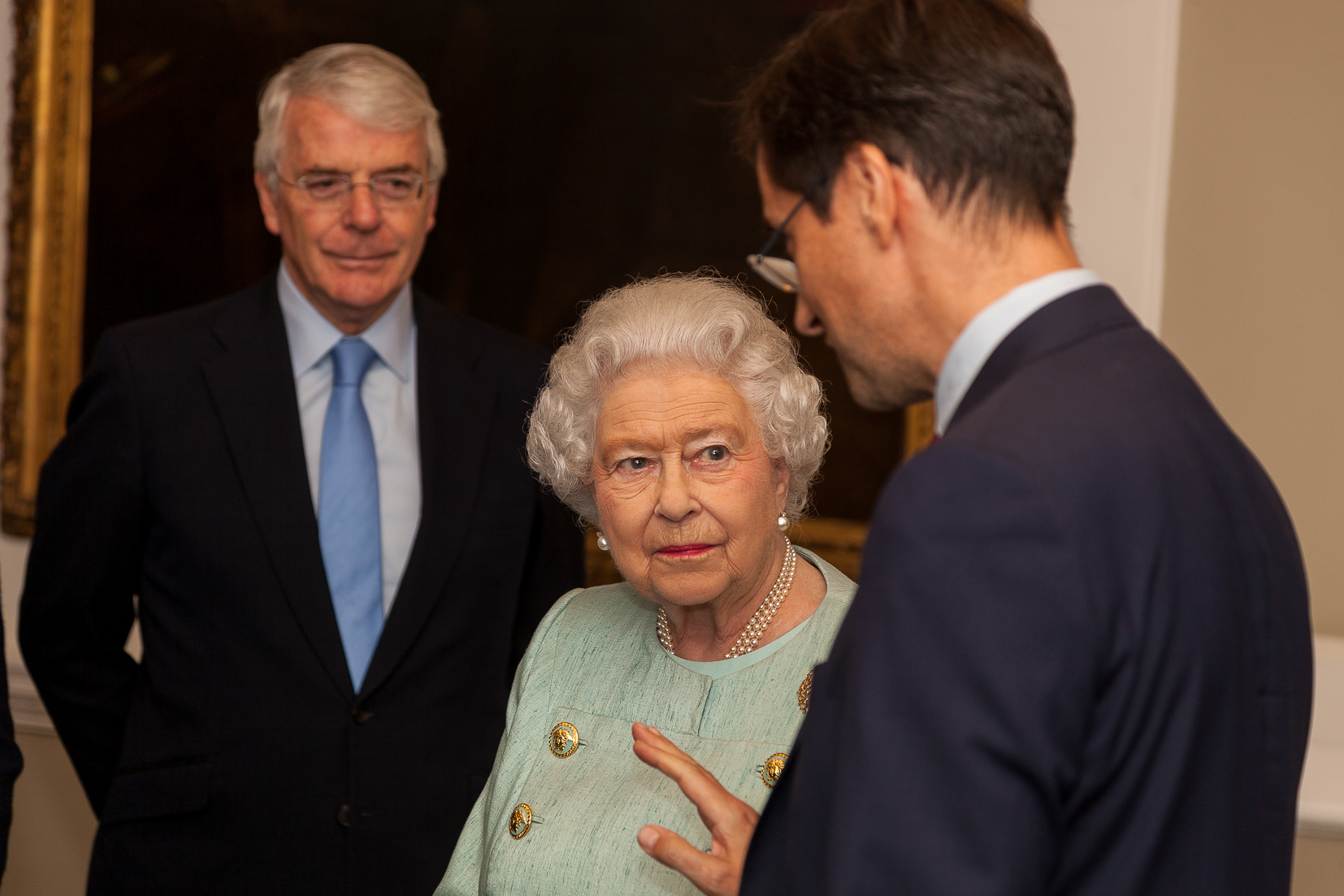
Major (left) with Queen Elizabeth II at Chatham House in 2012

Major has also pursued a variety of business interests, taking up appointments as senior adviser to Credit Suisse, chairman of the board of senior advisers at Global Infrastructure Partners, Global Adviser to AECOM, Chairman of the International Advisory Board of the National Bank of Kuwait, and Chairman of the European Advisory Council of the Emerson Electric Company. He was a member of the Carlyle Group's European Advisory Board from 1998 and was appointed Chairman of Carlyle Europe in May 2001. He stood down from the Group circa 2004–05. Major was also a director of the Mayflower Corporation, a bus manufacturer, from 2000 to 2003. The company was liquidated in 2004 due to funding issues.

Following the death of Diana, Princess of Wales in 1997, Major was appointed a special guardian to Princes William and Harry, with responsibility for legal and administrative matters. As a result of this, Major was the only current or former prime minister out of the five then still alive invited to the wedding of Prince Harry and Meghan Markle in May 2018. Major has also attended the funerals of notable political figures, such as Nelson Mandela in December 2013, former US first lady Barbara Bush at St. Martin's Episcopal Church in Houston, Texas, on 21 April 2018, and the state funeral of George H. W. Bush on 5 December 2018.

=== Revelation of affair ===
In September 2002, Edwina Currie revealed that from 1984 to 1988, prior to Major's elevation to the Cabinet, they had a four-year-long extramarital affair. Commentators were quick to invoke Major's previous 'Back to Basics' platform when accusing him of hypocrisy. An obituary of Tony Newton in The Daily Telegraph wrote that if Newton had not kept the affair a closely guarded secret, "it is highly unlikely that Major would have become prime minister". In a press statement, Major said that he was "ashamed" by the affair and that his wife had forgiven him. In response, Currie said, "he wasn't ashamed of it at the time and he wanted it to continue." The affair was the subject of a 2004 theatre play and a 2022 TV documentary by Channel 5.

Major had previously sued two magazines in 1993, New Statesman and Society and Scallywag, as well as their distributors, for reporting rumours of an affair with Clare Latimer, a Downing Street caterer, even though at least one of the magazines had said that the rumours were false. The allegations of an affair with Latimer were indeed proven false. After the affair with Currie came out a decade later, both of these publications considered legal action to recover their costs.

=== Political engagement ===
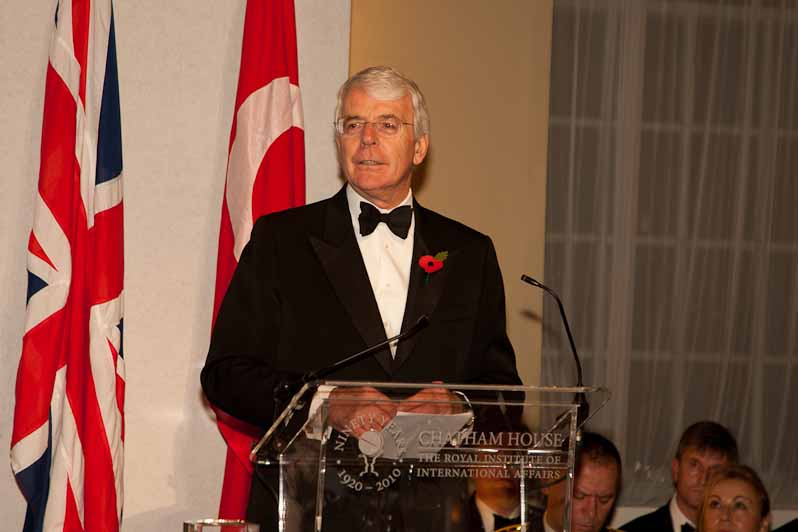
Major delivering a speech at Chatham House in 2010

Major has become an active after-dinner speaker, earning over £25,000 per engagement for his "insights and his own opinions" on politics and other matters according to his agency. Major is also actively involved in various think tanks: he is the chair of the Panel of senior advisers at Chatham House (having previously served as a president of Chatham House), a member of the International Advisory Boards of the Peres Center for Peace in Israel, the InterAction Council, the Baker Institute in Houston, and a Patron of the Atlantic Partnership. Major was also a director with the Ditchley Foundation from 2000 to 2009, and a president of the influential centre-right think tank the Bow Group from 2012 to 2014.

In February 2005, it was reported that Major and Norman Lamont delayed the release of papers on Black Wednesday under the Freedom of Information Act. Major denied doing so, saying that he had not heard of the request until the scheduled release date and had merely asked to look at the papers himself. He told BBC News that he and Lamont had been the victims of "whispering voices" to the press. He later publicly approved the release of the papers.

In December 2006, Major led calls for an independent inquiry into Blair's decision to invade Iraq, following revelations made by Carne Ross, a former British senior diplomat, that contradicted Blair's case for the invasion.

He was touted as a possible Conservative candidate in the 2008 London mayoral election, but turned down an offer from the Leader of the Conservatives at the time, David Cameron. A spokesperson for Major said, "his political career is behind him".

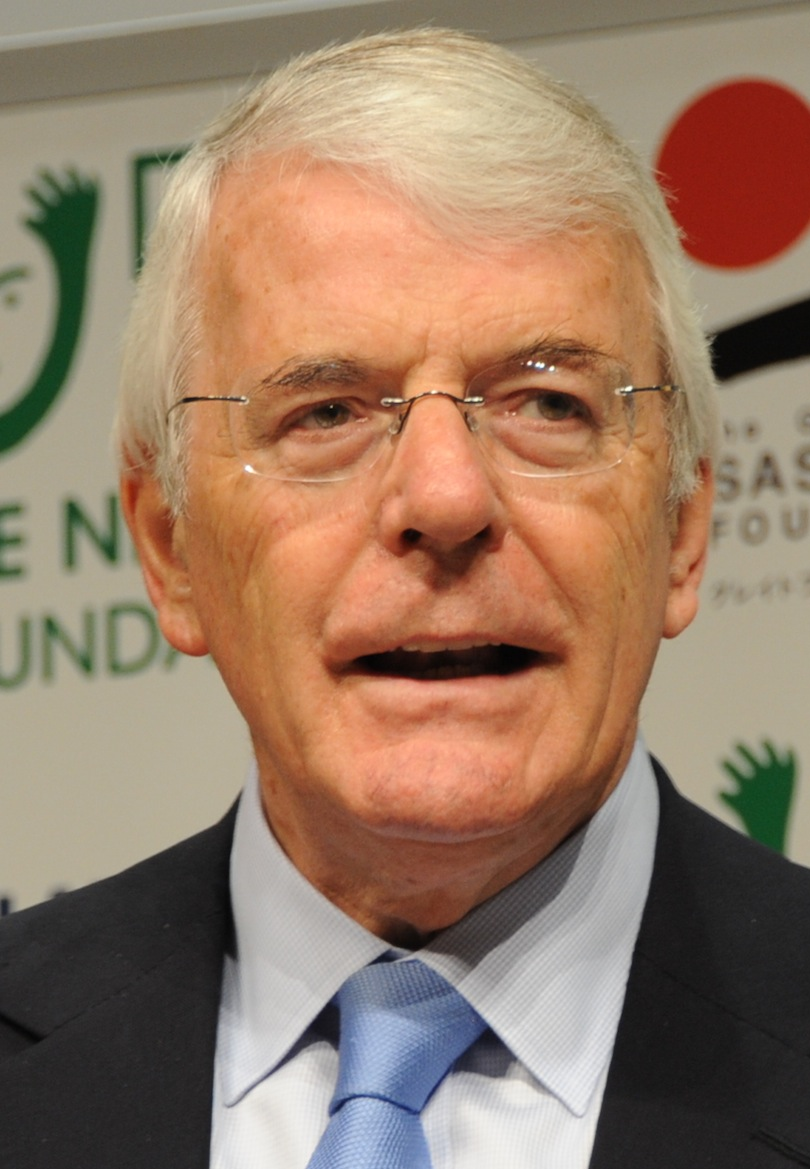
Major delivering a speech at The Role of the Nation State in Addressing Global Challenges in 2014

Following the 2010 general election, Major announced his support for the Cameron–Clegg coalition, and stated that he hoped for a "liberal conservative" alliance beyond 2015, criticising Labour under Ed Miliband for playing "party games" rather than serving the national interest. Nevertheless, in 2013 Major expressed his concern at the seeming decline in social mobility in Britain: "In every single sphere of British influence, the upper echelons of power in 2013 are held overwhelmingly by the privately educated or the affluent middle class. To me, from my background, I find that truly shocking."

During the 2014 Scottish independence referendum Major strongly encouraged a "No" vote, stating that a vote for independence would be damaging both for Scotland and the rest of the UK. This was similar to his stance on devolution in Scotland before referendums on the subject were held in both Scotland and Wales in 1997.

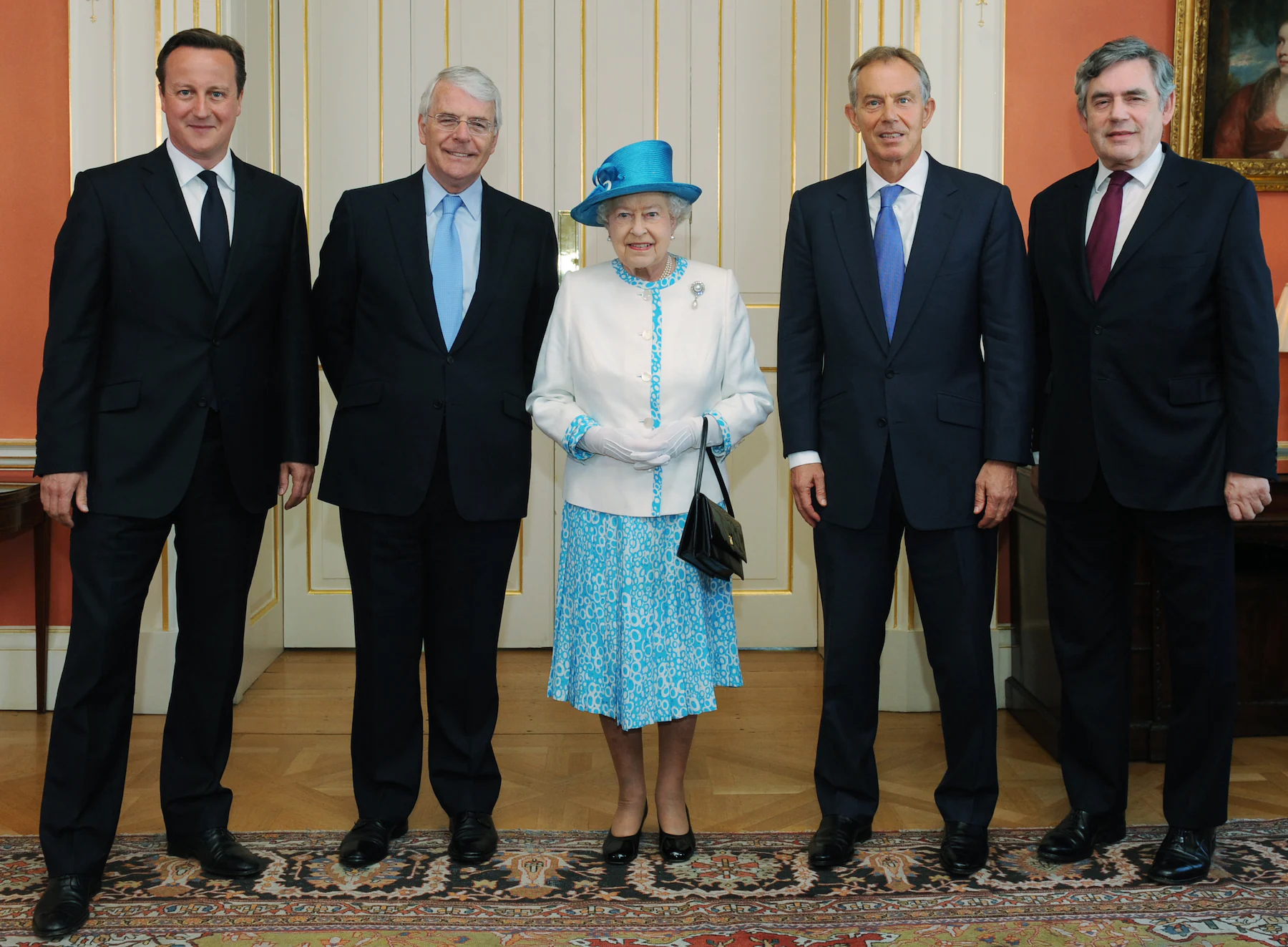
Major with Queen Elizabeth II, Prime Minister David Cameron, and former prime ministers Tony Blair and Gordon Brown

Major was a vocal supporter of the Remain campaign in the 2016 referendum on British membership of the European Union. Major supported a second referendum on Brexit, stating that the leave campaign put out a "fantasy case" during the referendum campaign, adding that to describe a second vote as undemocratic was "a rather curious proposition" and that he could see no "intellectual argument" against redoing the ballot. Major feared Brexit would make the UK poorer and could endanger the peace settlement in Northern Ireland.

On 30 August 2019, it was announced that Major intended to join a court case by Gina Miller against the proroguing of Parliament by the prime minister at the time, Boris Johnson. In the 2019 general election Major urged voters to vote tactically against candidates supporting Boris Johnson when those candidates wanted a hard Brexit. Major said Brexit is "the worst foreign policy decision in my lifetime. It will affect nearly every single aspect of our lives for many decades to come. It will make our country poorer and weaker. It will hurt most those who have least. Never have the stakes been higher, especially for the young. Brexit may even break up our historic United Kingdom." In early 2020, after the UK formally left the EU with an initial deal, Major expressed his concerns about a future trading deal with the EU being "flimsy".

In February 2022, Major made a speech at the Institute for Government think-tank in London, in which he criticised Johnson over the Partygate scandal and suggested that he ought to resign. Major also criticised the proposed policy for those seeking asylum, which he called "un-British". In July 2022, immediately following Johnson's announcement that he intended to resign as prime minister but would stay until a successor was chosen, Major called for Johnson's immediate replacement and removal "for the overall wellbeing of the country".

In February 2023, Major made a speech at the Northern Ireland Affairs Select Committee, where he said that Brexit was "a colossal mistake" and that Johnson had agreed to the Brexit protocol knowing it was "a mess".

== Assessment and legacy ==
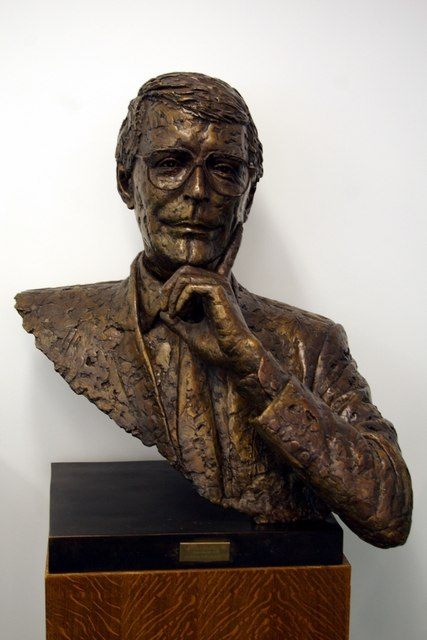
Bust of Major by Shenda Amery in Huntingdon Library

Major's more conciliatory political style contrasted with Thatcher's, though much of his policy agenda continued the Thatcherite programme. The parliamentary Conservative Party nevertheless remained divided, particularly over the extent of Britain's integration with the European Union. Major never succeeded in reconciling the ‘Euro-rebels’ among his MPs—who, although relatively few in number, wielded great influence because of his small majority and their wider following among Conservative activists and voters—with his European policy. Episodes such as the Maastricht Rebellion, led by Bill Cash and Thatcher, inflicted serious political damage on him and his government. The manner in which Thatcher had been deposed generated further opposition to Major's leadership on the right wing of the Conservative Party, with many viewing him as a weak and vacillating leader. Sleaze-related scandals involving leading Conservative MPs further reduced public support for the party.

Tony Blair was elected as Labour leader in 1994. His shift of Labour towards the centre, alongside continuing Conservative divisions, contributed to perceptions that Labour had become more electable. Major was widely perceived as a weak and ineffectual figure. Black Wednesday severely damaged the Conservatives' reputation for effective economic management.

Major defended his government in his memoir, focusing particularly on how under him the British economy had recovered from the recession of 1990–1993. He wrote that "during my premiership interest rates fell from 14% to 6%; unemployment was at 1.75 million when I took office, and at 1.6 million and falling upon my departure; and the government's annual borrowing rose from £0.5 billion to nearly £46 billion at its peak before falling to £1 billion". Major's Chancellor Kenneth Clarke stated in 2016 that Major's reputation looked better as time went by, in contrast to Blair's, which appeared to be in decline. Paddy Ashdown, the Leader of the Liberal Democrats during Major's term of office, wrote in 2017 that Major was "one of the most honest, brave and sincere men to ever be Prime Minister" and that his time in office compares favourably with that of Blair.

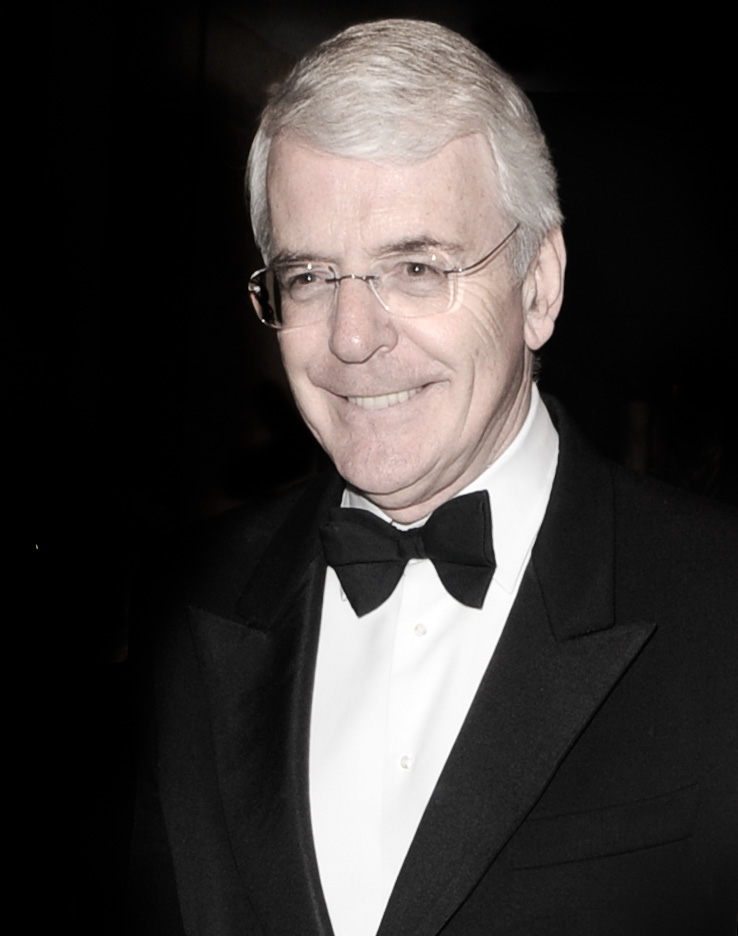
Major at a fundraising event in Central London in 2009

Shortly after Major left office, the historian and journalist Paul Johnson wrote that he was "a hopeless leader" who "should never have been Prime Minister". The sentiments echoed those of much of the press at the time, which was generally hostile to Major, especially after Black Wednesday. The journalist Peter Oborne was one such figure, though he stated in 2017 that he now regretted his negative reporting, saying that he himself and the press in general were "grossly unfair to Major" and that this was motivated at least in part by snobbery at Major's humble upbringing. In 2012 Oborne had written that Major's government looked ever more successful as time went by. Oborne singled out Major's achievements in the Northern Irish peace process, in boosting the economy, in keeping Britain out of the eurozone, and in reforming public services as worthy of praise. Others remain unconvinced; writing in 2011, the BBC's Home Editor Mark Easton judged that "Majorism" had made little lasting impact.

Later assessments of Major's legacy have remained mixed. Mark Stuart, writing in 2017, stated that Major is "the best ex-Prime Minister we have ever had", praising him for initiating the Northern Ireland peace process, peacefully handing Hong Kong back to China, creating the National Lottery and leaving a sound economy to Labour in 1997. Dennis Kavanagh likewise states that Major did relatively well considering the unbridgeable divides that existed in the Conservative Party in the 1990s, chiefly over Europe, whilst also delivering economic growth, a more user-focused public sector and the basis of a peace settlement in Northern Ireland. He also notes that Major's unexpected 1992 election victory effectively sealed in the Thatcher-era reforms and forced the Labour Party to ditch most of its more socialist-tinged policies, thereby permanently shifting the British political landscape to the centre ground. Anthony Seldon largely agrees with this assessment, adding that Major's deep dislike of discrimination contributed to the continuing decline in racism and homophobia in British society, and that his proactive foreign policy stance maintained Britain's influence in the world at a time of profound global change. He also notes that Major faced a deeply unfavourable set of circumstances: most of the obvious and pressing Conservative reforms (e.g. reining in the power of trade unions and privatising failing industries) had already been completed under Thatcher; the swift nature of his rise to power left him little time to formulate policy positions; and upon becoming prime minister, he was immediately thrust into having to deal with the Gulf War and a major recession. Furthermore, the narrow majority achieved after the 1992 election left him exposed to internal Conservative rebellions, which only worsened as time went by, abetted by a hostile press, as it became clear the Conservatives would lose the next election. Seldon concludes that "Major was neither non-entity nor failure. His will be judged an important if unruly premiership at the end of the Conservative century, completing some parts of an earlier agenda while in some key respects helping to define a Conservatism for the 21st century." Seldon reiterated these views in his contribution to the 2017 volume John Major: An Unsuccessful Prime Minister?

Political historian Robert Taylor, in his 2006 biography of Major, concurs with many of these points, summing up that "In the perspective provided by the years of New Labour government since May 1997, John Major's record as Prime Minister looked much better than his many critics liked to suggest... Britain's most extraordinary Conservative Prime Minister bequeathed an important legacy to this party and his country to build on. One day both yet may come to recognise and appreciate it." In 2004, writer Dick Leonard was more harsh in his assessment, concluding that Major was "a man of evident decent instincts, but limited abilities: as Prime Minister he pushed these abilities to the limit. It was not enough."

== Representation in the media ==
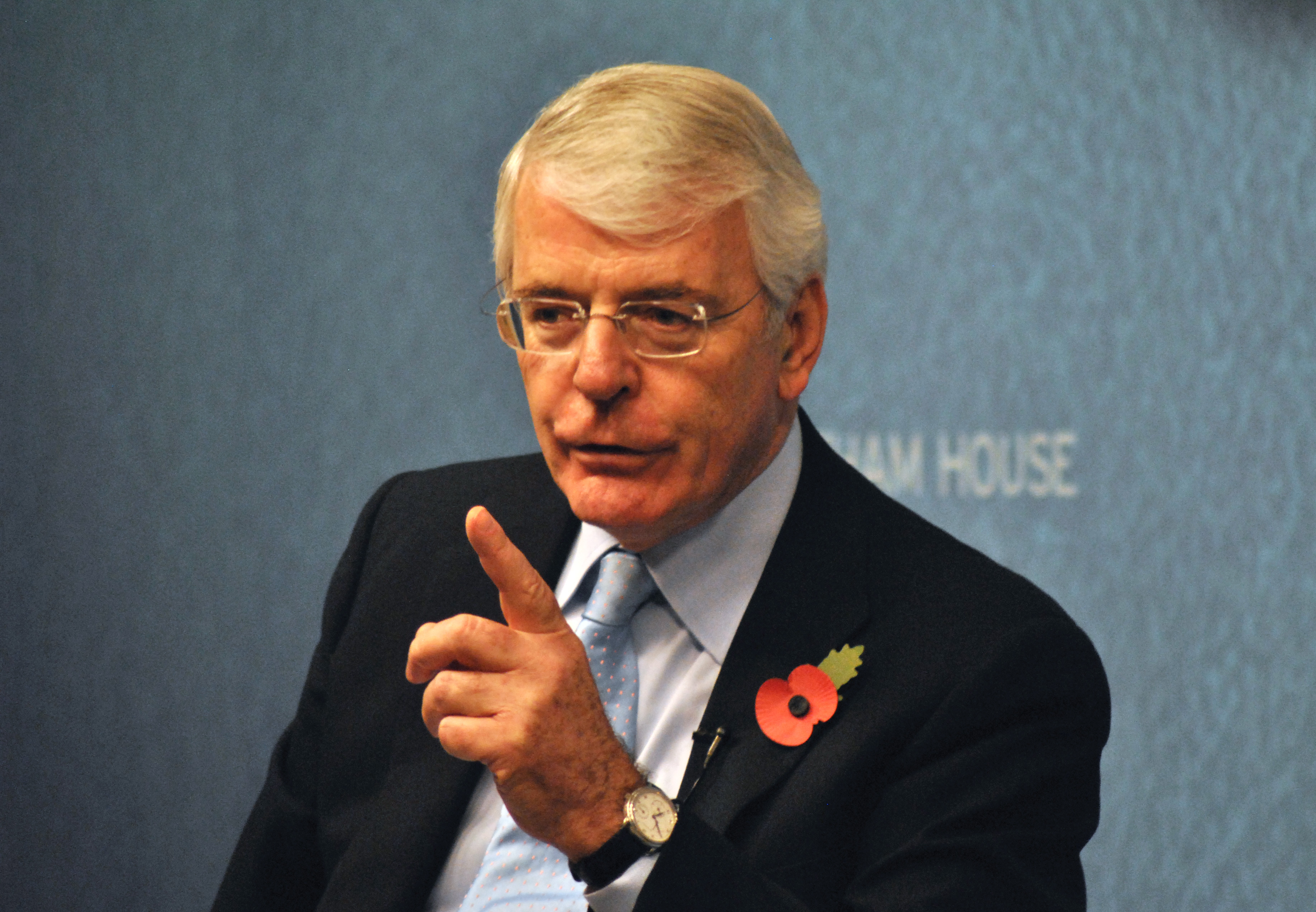
Major at Chatham House in 2011

During his leadership of the Conservative Party, Major was portrayed as honest ("Honest John") but unable to exert effective control over his fractious party. However, his polite, easy-going manner was initially well received by both his supporters and his critics. Major's appearance was noted for its greyness, his prodigious philtrum, and large glasses, all of which were exaggerated in caricatures. For example, in Spitting Image, Major's puppet was changed from a circus performer to a literally grey man who ate dinner with his wife in silence, occasionally saying "nice peas, dear", while at the same time nursing an unrequited crush on his colleague Virginia Bottomley – an invention, but an ironic one in view of his affair with Edwina Currie, which was not then a matter of public knowledge. By the end of his premiership his puppet would often be shown observing the latest fiasco and ineffectually murmuring "oh dear". Long-standing Conservative MP Enoch Powell, when asked about Major, stated, "I simply find myself asking – does he really exist?" whereas Labour's Alastair Campbell dismissed him as a "piece of lettuce that passes for prime minister" and Labour MP Tony Banks said of Major in 1994 that "He was a fairly competent Chairman of Housing on Lambeth Council. Every time he gets up now I keep thinking, 'What on earth is Councillor Major doing?' I can't believe he's here and sometimes I think he can't either."

The media (particularly The Guardian cartoonist Steve Bell) used the allegation by Alastair Campbell that he had observed Major tucking his shirt into his underpants to caricature him wearing his pants outside his trousers, as a pale grey echo of both Superman and Supermac, a parody of Harold Macmillan. Bell also used the humorous possibilities of the Cones Hotline, a means for the public to inform the authorities of potentially unnecessary traffic cones, which was part of the Citizen's Charter project established by John Major. Major was also satirised by Patrick Wright with his book 101 Uses for a John Major (based on a comic book of some 10 years earlier called 101 Uses for a Dead Cat), in which Major was illustrated serving a number of bizarre purposes, such as a train-spotter's anorak or as a flag-pole.

Private Eye parodied Sue Townsend's The Secret Diary of Adrian Mole, age 13¾ to run a regular column The Secret Diary of John Major, age 47¾, in which Major was portrayed as naïve and childish, keeping lists of his enemies in a Rymans notebook he termed his "Bastards Book", and featuring "my wife Norman" and "Mr Dr Mawhinney" as recurring characters. The magazine still runs one-off specials of this diary (with the age updated) on occasions when Major is in the news, such as on the breaking of the Edwina Currie story or the publication of his autobiography.

The impressionist and comedian Rory Bremner often mocked Major, for example by depicting him as 'John 90', a play on the 1960s puppet show Joe 90; his impersonation was so accurate that he managed to fool the MP Richard Body into believing that he was speaking to Major in a prank phone call. The incident prompted Cabinet Secretary Robin Butler to warn Channel 4 head Michael Grade against any further calls for fear that state secrets could be inadvertently leaked.

Major was often mocked for his nostalgic evocation of what sounded like the lost Britain of the 1950s; for example, in his famous speech, he stated that "Fifty years from now Britain will still be the country of long shadows on county grounds, warm beer, invincible green suburbs, dog lovers and pools fillers and – as George Orwell said – 'old maids bicycling to Holy Communion through the morning mist'." Major complained in his memoirs that these words (which drew upon a passage in George Orwell's essay The Lion and the Unicorn)) had been misrepresented as being more naive and romantic than he had intended, and indeed his memoirs were dismissive of the common conservative viewpoint that there was once a time of moral rectitude; Major wrote that "life has never been as simple as that". Throughout his time in office Major was often acutely sensitive to criticism of him in the press; his biographer Anthony Seldon attributes this to an inner vulnerability stemming from his difficult childhood and adolescence. After leaving office, Major stated that "Perhaps up to a point I was too sensitive about some of the things in the press, I'm happy to concede that. But, the politicians who are said to have hides like rhinos and be utterly impervious to criticism, if they're not extinct, they are very rare and I freely confess I wasn't amongst them."

Major has been depicted on screen by Keith Drinkel in Thatcher: The Final Days (1991), Michael Maloney in Margaret (2009), Robin Kermode in The Iron Lady (2011), Marc Ozall in the TV series The Crown (fourth season), Gordon Griffin in Westminster on Trial and Roger Sansom in On the Record. Footage of Major's 1992 election win is used in Patrick Keiller's 1994 documentary film London. Major was also one of the prime ministers portrayed in the 2013 stage play The Audience.

Major was portrayed by Jonny Lee Miller in the fifth season of The Crown in 2022. Major called the series a "barrel-load of nonsense" for a fictitious storyline in which the then Prince Charles lobbies Major in 1991, attempting to oust Queen Elizabeth II from power. Netflix defended the series as a "fictional dramatisation".

Major was satirised in The Comic Strip Presents... special Red Nose of Courage, broadcast on BBC Two on the day of the 1992 general election, which depicted him as prime minister by day and Coco the Clown at night.

== Personal life ==
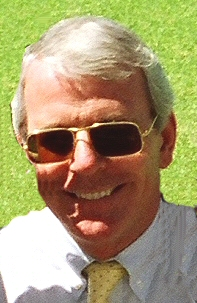
Major at a 2008 cricket match

=== Family ===
Major married Norma Johnson (now Dame Norma Major) on 3 October 1970 at St Matthew's Church, Brixton. She was a teacher and a member of the Young Conservatives. They met on polling day for the Greater London Council elections in London, and became engaged after only ten days. They have two children: a daughter, Elizabeth (born November 1971) and a son, James (born January 1975). They continue to live at their constituency home, Finings, in Great Stukeley, Huntingdonshire. They also own a flat in London and a holiday home on the Norfolk coast at Weybourne, which they have in the past invited ex-soldiers to use for free as part of the Afghan Heroes charity. As with all former prime ministers, Major is entitled to round-the-clock police protection.

Major's daughter, Elizabeth Major, a veterinary nurse, married Luke Salter on 26 March 2000 at All Saints' Church, Somerby, having been in a relationship with him since 1988. Salter died on 22 November 2002 from cancer. Major's son, James Major, a former retail manager and nightclub promoter, married game show hostess Emma Noble on 29 March 1999 in the Chapel Crypt at Westminster Abbey. They had a son, Harrison, born in July 2000, who was later diagnosed with autism. The marriage ended in an acrimonious divorce in 2003, with Noble accusing Major of "unreasonable behaviour". James later married Kate Postlethwaite (née Dorrell), the mother of his second son.

Major's elder brother, Terry, who died in 2007, became a minor media personality during Major's period in Downing Street, writing a 1994 autobiography, Major Major: Memories of an Older Brother, and appearing on TV shows such as Have I Got News for You. John's sister, Patricia Dessoy, kept a much lower profile; she died in 2017. After leaving office Major became aware that his father had fathered two half-siblings extramaritally: Tom Moss and Kathleen Lemmon.

Research conducted by Paul Penn-Simkins, a genealogist formerly employed as a researcher at the College of Arms and as a heraldic consultant at Christie's, and subsequently corroborated by Lynda Rippin, a genealogist employed by Lincolnshire Council, showed that John Major and Margaret Thatcher were fifth cousins once removed, both descending from the Crust family, who farmed at Leake, near Boston, Lincolnshire.

=== Sports ===
Major has been keen on sports since his youth, most notably cricket; he is also a supporter of Chelsea F.C. and a Patron of British Gymnastics. He also enjoys gardening, listening to music and reading, Anthony Trollope being among his favourite authors.

=== Religious beliefs ===
Major is a Christian, though his upbringing was never especially religious and he states that he is "a believer at a distance". He shied away from the topic when in office, stating that "I have always been a little wary of politicians who parade their faith, and prefer a little English reserve on the subject."

== Honours and awards ==
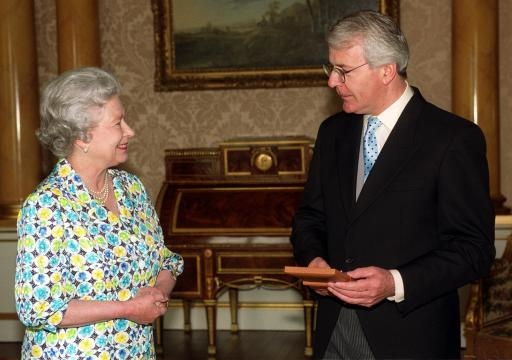
Major receiving the insignia of a Member of the Order of the Companions of Honour from the Queen at Buckingham Palace, 1999

In the 1999 New Year Honours List, Major was made a Member of the Order of the Companions of Honour for his work on the Northern Ireland peace process.

On 23 April 2005, Major received a knighthood as a Knight Companion of the Order of the Garter from Queen Elizabeth II. He was installed at St George's Chapel, Windsor, on 13 June. Membership of the Order of the Garter is limited in number to 24 and, as a personal gift of the Monarch, is an honour traditionally bestowed on former prime ministers.

On 20 June 2008, Major was granted the Freedom of the City of Cork. He was also granted the Outstanding Contribution to Ireland award in Dublin on 4 December 2014.

On 8 May 2012, Major was personally decorated at the Imperial Palace in Tokyo by the Emperor of Japan with the Grand Cordon of the Order of the Rising Sun in recognition of his invaluable contributions to Japan–UK relations through his work in the political and economic arenas and his promotion of mutual understanding. While prime minister, Major had pursued energetic campaigns aimed at boosting bilateral trade: "Priority Japan" (1991–1994) and "Action Japan" (1994–1997). The 1991 Japan Festival also took place under his premiership. He was awarded the Honorary Degree of Doctor of Laws (LL.D) by Queen's University Belfast on 10 November 2023.

In 2008, Major won the British Sports Book Awards (Best Cricket Book) for More Than a Game.

=== Public commemoration ===
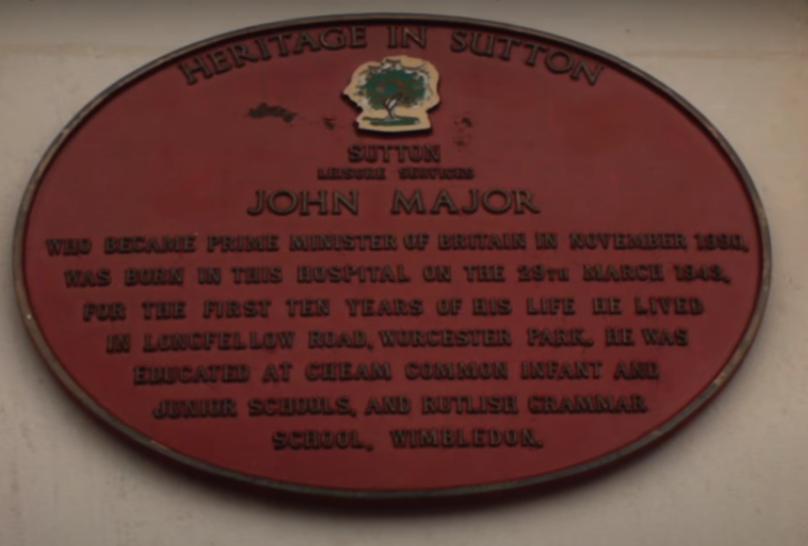
A plaque on St Helier Hospital, Sutton

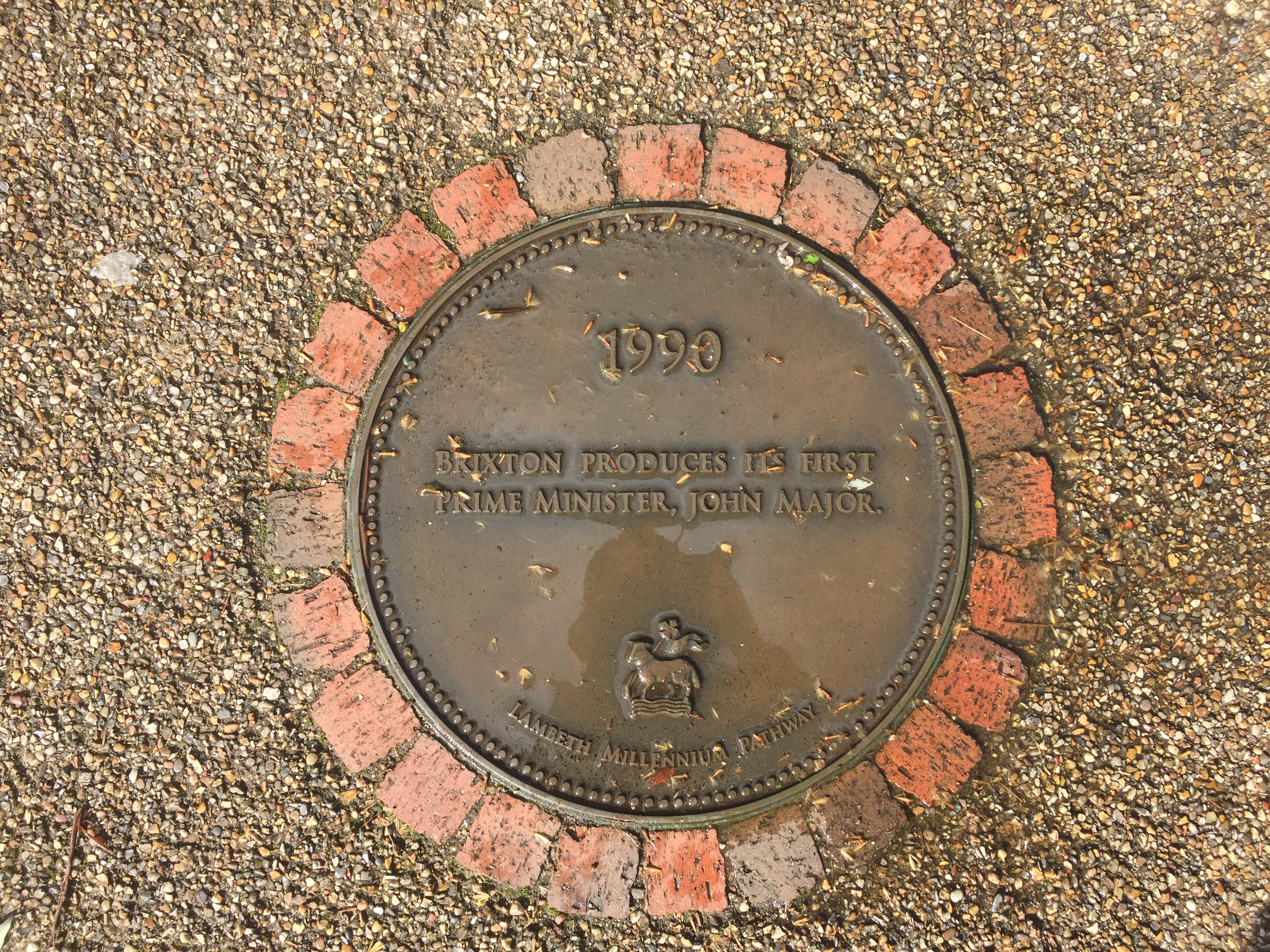
A plaque in Archbishop's Park, Lambeth

Two plaques commemorating John Major in South London.

An oil painting of Major, painted in 1996 by June Mendoza, is part of the Parliamentary collection, as is a bronze bust by Anne Curry, unveiled in the Members' Lobby on 16 October 2017. There is another bust of Major in the Norman Shaw Building North by Neale Andrew, sculpted in 1993 and installed in 2004; however, this is not accessible to the public. A large bust of John Major by Shenda Amery in Huntingdon Library was unveiled by his wife, Norma, in 1993.

A painting of John Major by Diccon Swan is on display at the Carlton Club and was unveiled by his wife Norma in 1994. The National Portrait Gallery holds two paintings of Major – the first official portrait of him as prime minister, painted by Peter Deighan in 1994, and one of John and Norma by John Wonnacott, painted in 1997. There is a large John Major Suite at The Oval, home to Surrey County Cricket Club; the venue also contains a painting of Major.

There is a 'Heritage in Sutton' plaque on St Helier Hospital, where John Major was born in 1943, and a plaque commemorating him in Archbishop's Park next to Lambeth Palace, included as part of the Lambeth Millennium Pathway. There are also various plaques commemorating facilities opened by John Major: at Brampton Memorial Centre, Brampton (opened 1988), Hamerton Zoo Park, Hamerton (1990), Cadbury World, Birmingham (1991), a tree commemorating the restoration of the River Mill pub, Eaton Socon, the gardens at Hinchingbrooke Hospital, Huntingdon (2009), the North Terminal extension at Gatwick Airport (2011), Huntingdonshire Football Association headquarters, Huntingdon (2015), and Alconbury Weald cricket pitch (2019).

In 2013, the town of Candeleda in Spain named a street after John Major (Avenida de John Major), since Major has holidayed there for many years. Major Close, in Loughborough Junction near where John grew up, is also named after him; the street was to be called 'Sir John Major Close' but this long name breached council guidelines.

In type theory, heterogeneous equality, that is, a form of equality predicate defined for pairs of elements of arbitrary types, not just elements of the same type, is sometimes referred to as John Major's equality (JMeq), following Conor McBride:

John Major's 'classless society' widened people's aspirations to equality, but also the gap between rich and poor. After all, aspiring to be equal to others than oneself is the politics of envy. In much the same way, $\simeq$ forms equations between members of any type, but they cannot be treated as equals (ie substituted) unless they are of the same type. Just as before, each thing is only equal to itself.

=== Arms ===
Coat of arms of Sir John Major
Adopted 2005 Crest A Demi-stag Gules attired and unguled Or langued Azure holding between its forelegs a double-warded Key Or wards 'M' upwards and ribboned Gules Azure and Argent Escutcheon Chequy Vert and Azure over all a Portcullis Or in chief three Torteaux Gules Motto Adeste comites (Rally round, comrades) Other elements Garter circlet and appended Member of the Order of the Companions of Honour insignia Banner The banner of John Major's arms used as Knight Companion of the Garter at St George's Chapel.

== Selected works ==
- Major, John (2000). John Major: The Autobiography. London: HarperCollins. ISBN 978-0-00-257004-6.
- Major, John (2007). More Than a Game: The Story of Cricket's Early Years. London: HarperCollins. ISBN 978-0-00-718364-7.
- Major, John (2012). My Old Man: A Personal History of Music Hall. London: HarperCollins. ISBN 978-0-00-745014-5.

== See also ==
- Electoral history of John Major

== Bibliography ==
- Bennett, Gillian (1996). "'Camera, Lights Action!': The British General Election 1992 as Narrative Event". Folklore. 107 (1–2): 94–97. doi:10.1080/0015587x.1996.9715921. ISSN 0015-587X.
- Major, John (2000). John Major: The Autobiography. London: HarperCollins. ISBN 978-0-00-257004-6.
- Seldon, Anthony (1998) [1997]. Major: A Political Life. London: Phoenix Books. ISBN 978-0-7538-0145-1.
- Snowdon, Peter (2010). Back from the Brink: The Extraordinary Fall and Rise of the Conservative Party. London: HarperPress. ISBN 978-0-00-730884-2.
- Taylor, Robert (2006). Major. London: Haus Publishing. ISBN 978-1-904950-72-1.
- Turner, Alwyn W. (2013). A Classless Society: Britain in the 1990s. Aurum Press Ltd. ISBN 978-1-78131-068-7.

Parliament of the United Kingdom
Preceded by David Renton	Member of Parliament for Huntingdonshire; 1979–1983	Constituency abolished
New constituency	Member of Parliament for Huntingdon; 1983–2001	Succeeded by Jonathan Djanogly
Political offices
Preceded by John MacGregor	Chief Secretary to the Treasury; 1987–1989	Succeeded by Norman Lamont
Preceded by Geoffrey Howe	Foreign Secretary; 1989	Succeeded by Douglas Hurd
Preceded by Nigel Lawson	Chancellor of the Exchequer; 1989–1990	Succeeded by Norman Lamont
Preceded by Nigel Lawson	Second Lord of the Treasury; 1989–1990	Succeeded by Norman Lamont
Preceded by Margaret Thatcher	Prime Minister of the United Kingdom; 1990–1997	Succeeded by Tony Blair
Preceded by Margaret Thatcher	First Lord of the Treasury; 1990–1997	Succeeded by Tony Blair
Preceded by Margaret Thatcher	Minister for the Civil Service; 1990–1997	Succeeded by Tony Blair
Preceded by Tony Blair	Leader of the Opposition; 1997	Succeeded by William Hague
Preceded by Robin Cook	Shadow Foreign Secretary; 1997	Succeeded by Michael Howard
Preceded by The Lord Clark of Windermere	Shadow Secretary of State for Defence; 1997	Succeeded by George Young
Party political offices
Preceded by Margaret Thatcher	Leader of the Conservative Party; 1990–1997	Succeeded by William Hague
Diplomatic posts
Preceded by George H. W. Bush	Chairperson of the Group of 7; 1991	Succeeded by Helmut Kohl
Sporting positions
Preceded by Micky Stewart	President of Surrey CCC; 2000–2002	Succeeded by Brian Downing
