= Premiership of John Major =

Period of the Government of the United Kingdom from 1990 to 1997

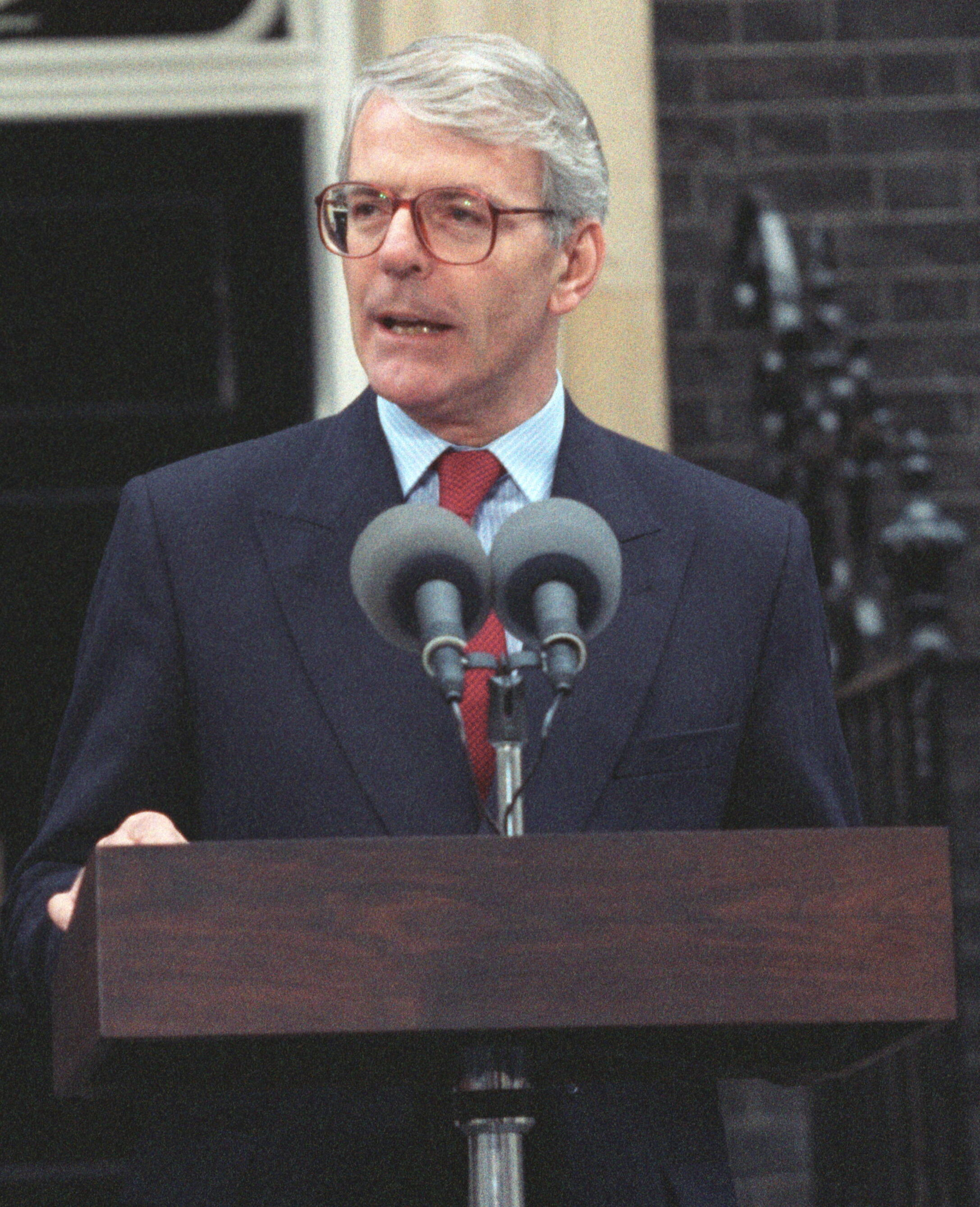
- Major in 1995
- Premiership of John Major; 28 November 1990 – 2 May 1997
- Monarch: Elizabeth II
- Cabinet: First Major ministry; Second Major ministry
- Party: Conservative
- Election: 1992
- Seat: 10 Downing Street
- Coat of Arms of HM Government

John Major's tenure as Prime Minister of the United Kingdom began on 28 November 1990 when he accepted an invitation from Queen Elizabeth II to form a government, succeeding Margaret Thatcher, and ended on 2 May 1997 upon his resignation. As prime minister, Major also served simultaneously as First Lord of the Treasury and Minister for the Civil Service; he was also concurrently Leader of the Conservative Party. Major's mild-mannered style and moderate political stance contrasted with that of Thatcher.

After Thatcher resigned as prime minister following a challenge to her leadership, Major entered the second stage of the contest to replace her and emerged victorious, becoming prime minister. Major went on to lead the Conservative Party to a fourth consecutive electoral victory at the 1992 election, the only election he won during his seven-year-premiership. Although the Conservatives lost 40 seats, they won over 14 million votes, which remains to this day a record for any British political party.

As prime minister, Major created the Citizen's Charter, removed the Poll Tax and replaced it with the Council Tax, committed British troops to the Gulf War, took charge of the UK's negotiations over the Maastricht Treaty of the European Union (EU), led the country during the early 1990s economic crisis, withdrew the pound from the European Exchange Rate Mechanism (a day which came to be known as Black Wednesday), promoted the socially conservative back to basics campaign, passed further reforms to education and criminal justice, privatised the railways and coal industry, and also played a pivotal role in creating peace in Northern Ireland.

Internal Conservative Party divisions on the EU, a number of scandals involving Conservative MPs (widely known as "sleaze"), and questions about his economic credibility are seen as the main factors that led Major to resign as party leader in June 1995. However, he sought reelection as Conservative leader in the 1995 Conservative leadership election, and was comfortably re-elected. Notwithstanding, public opinion of his leadership was poor, both before and after. By December 1996, the government had lost its majority in the House of Commons due to a series of by-election defeats and an MP crossing the floor. Major sought to rebuild public trust in the Conservatives following a series of scandals, including the events of Black Wednesday in 1992, through campaigning on the strength of the economic recovery following the early 1990s recession, but faced divisions within the party over the UK's membership of the European Union.

The Conservatives lost the 1997 general election in a landslide to the opposition Labour Party led by Tony Blair, ending 18 years of Conservative government. After Blair succeeded Major as prime minister, Major served as Leader of the Opposition for seven weeks while the leadership election to replace him took place. He formed a temporary shadow cabinet, and Major himself served as shadow foreign secretary and shadow secretary of state for defence. His resignation as Conservative leader formally took effect in June 1997 following the election of William Hague.

== Conservative leadership bid ==
Opposition within the Conservative Party to Margaret Thatcher had been brewing for some time, focusing on what was seen as her brusque, imperious style and the poll tax, which was facing serious opposition across the country. In December 1989, she had survived a leadership bid by Anthony Meyer; though she won easily, 60 MPs had not voted for her, and it was rumoured that many more had had to be strong-armed into supporting her. By early 1990, it was clear that bills for many under the new poll tax regime would be higher than anticipated, and opposition to the Tax grew, with a non-payment campaign gaining much support and an anti-poll tax demonstration in Trafalgar Square in March ending in rioting. The Conservatives lost the 1990 Mid Staffordshire by-election to Labour and the 1990 Eastbourne by-election to the Liberal Democrats, both Conservative seats, causing many Conservative MPs to worry about their prospects at the upcoming general election, due in 1991 or 1992. Thatcher's staunch anti-European stance also alienated pro-Europe Conservatives. On 1 November, the pro-European deputy prime minister Geoffrey Howe resigned, issuing a fiercely critical broadside against Thatcher in the House of Commons on 13 November.

The day after Howe's speech Michael Heseltine, Thatcher's former Secretary of State for Defence who had acrimoniously resigned in 1986 over the Westland affair, challenged Thatcher for the leadership of the Conservative Party. Both John Major and Foreign Secretary Douglas Hurd supported Thatcher in the first round. Major was at home in Huntingdon recovering from a pre-arranged wisdom tooth operation during the first leadership ballot, which Thatcher won but not by the required threshold, necessitating a second round. Following discussions with her cabinet, in which many stated that though supporting her they doubted she could win, Thatcher withdrew from the contest and announced that she would resign as prime minister once a new leader had been elected. Major subsequently announced on 22 November that he would stand in the second ballot, with Thatcher's backing. Major's platform was one of moderation on Europe, a review of the poll tax, and the desire to build a "classless society".

Unlike in the first ballot, a candidate only required a simple majority of Conservative MPs to win, in this case 187 of 372 MPs. The ballot was held on the afternoon of 27 November; although Major obtained 185 votes, 2 votes short of an overall majority, he polled far enough ahead of both Hurd and Heseltine to secure their immediate withdrawal. With no remaining challengers, Major was formally named Leader of the Conservative Party that evening and was duly appointed prime minister the following day. At 47, he was the youngest prime minister since Lord Rosebery some 95 years earlier.

== Domestic ==
=== Immediate changes ===
Major aimed to consolidate the gains achieved during Thatcher's premiership, whilst also seeking to spread the rise in wealth seen in the Thatcher era across society more widely, so creating "a country at ease with itself." Concerned at the rise of inequality and relative poverty in the 1980s, Major sought to position himself as a 'One Nation' Tory, with a more compassionate attitude to those negatively affected by the social and economic changes enacted during the 1980s.

Upon becoming prime minister Major conducted a minor reshuffle, appointing Norman Lamont as chancellor, bringing back Michael Heseltine into Cabinet as environment secretary and later as deputy prime minister, and moving Kenneth Baker to the Home Office. Major was praised by colleagues for his more consensual Cabinet style, though the Labour Party criticised the lack of any women in his Cabinet. Thatcher, initially supportive of Major, over time came to regret her support for him, often issuing highly publicised criticisms of Major that he found increasingly irritating.

Amongst the first issues Major had to deal with upon taking office was replacing the deeply unpopular Poll Tax, a task he delegated to Michael Heseltine. The potential electoral fallout of keeping it was again underlined when the Conservatives lost a by-election in Ribble Valley in March 1991. A temporary relief grant of some £1 billion was granted to Local Authorities to offset the costs associated with the Tax. In April 1993 the Poll Tax was replaced with Council Tax, set at a sliding scale based on property prices, paid for partly by a rise in VAT.

Following a series of high-profile dog maulings, the Dangerous Dogs Act was enacted in 1991 to tackle the breeding of aggressive pedigrees.

=== Citizen's Charter ===
Major was firmly committed to tackling poor performance in the public sector and the often substandard levels of service faced by users, of which Major had personal experience. Major wished not only to improve performance, but also to change the overall culture of the sector into one that was more open, transparent, and consumer-focused. His idea was to create a set of guidelines and benchmarks against which progress could be measured and then published for the public, collectively referred to as the 'Citizen's Charter', which was formally launched on 23 March 1991. Major continued to push the idea despite opposition from within the Civil Service and the sometimes lukewarm support for the concept from his ministers. Tiring of the slow progress on implementation, Major created a Cabinet Office Committee under Andrew Whetnall to force through change and monitor departmental compliance. A major aspect of the Charter process was the introduction of public performance tables so as to 'name and shame' poor performers and thereby spur change; such tables were duly introduced in schools (with league tables), rail (with British Rail publishing performance figures) and the NHS (with waiting lists). Following his 1992 general election victory Major continued with Charter-related reforms, creating the 'Charter Mark' for those departments and organisations that were meeting their Charter targets. One less successful aspect of the reforms was the so-called 'Cones Hotline', a phoneline which motorists could use to report out-of-place coneage, which proved to be an embarrassing failure and a source of much mockery. However, overall the Charter went some way to change the culture of public services in Britain, with most of Major's initiatives in this area being left in place and indeed expanded by the Labour government after 1997.

=== 1992 general election victory ===
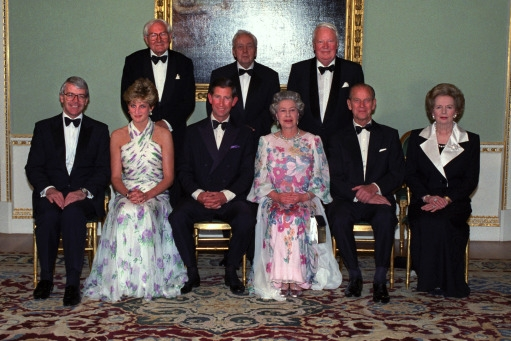
Major and his predecessors Margaret Thatcher, James Callaghan, Harold Wilson, and Edward Heath with The Queen and The Prince and Princess of Wales, July 1992

The UK economy entered a recession during 1990, which deepened in 1991, with unemployment rising rapidly to 2.5 million. The Conservatives had been consistently behind Labour in the opinion polls since 1989, and the gap had widened significantly during 1990, with Labour hoping that the economic gloom would convince voters to switch allegiance. However, the Conservatives managed to regain a lead after Thatcher left office, with opinion polls also showing Major as the most popular prime minister since Harold Macmillan in the early 1960s. Major pondered calling a snap election 1991, but poor local election results in 1991, followed by further by-election losses in Monmouth, Kincardine and elsewhere, convinced him to wait. Major also hoped that the economy may have recovered somewhat by 1992 (the last possible date the election could be called), and he was also keen to avoid accusations of exploiting the recent Gulf War victory for electoral advantage. In spite of Labour Leader Neil Kinnock's repeated calls for an immediate general election after Major became prime minister, it wasn't until 11 March 1992 that Major called an election for 9 April.

The Conservatives initially undertook a traditional-style campaign, with a series of set-piece policy launches and 'Meet John Major' public discussions, but Major felt these methods were too stage-managed and were failing to get through to voters. As a result, Major decided to take his campaign directly onto the streets, delivering addresses to the public from an upturned soapbox as he had done in his days with the Brixton Young Conservatives. This was opposed by many of Major's advisers, not least on security grounds, but Major enjoyed this aspect of the campaign immensely despite the often hostile crowds, and the soapbox orations chimed with the electorate. Major's ordinary background was also emphasised, being used on a poster stating "What does the Conservative Party offer a working class kid from Brixton? They made him Prime Minister" as well as a video entitled 'The Journey', in which Major revisited his childhood homes in Brixton. Major's approach stood in contrast to the Labour Party's much slicker campaign, most notably a US-style political rally in Sheffield which was widely criticised as being overly bombastic and prematurely triumphalist. The Conservatives also conducted a hard-hitting negative campaign, stating that Labour would spend excessively resulting in a 'tax bombshell' and a 'double whammy' of higher taxes and a rise in inflation. Much of the press was also hostile to Labour, with The Sun issuing a notorious front-page on the day of the election featuring Neil Kinnock's head in a lightbulb under the headline 'If Kinnock wins today will the last person to leave Britain please turn out the lights'. (Note: The following day the paper ran with the equally infamous headline 'It's The Sun Wot Won It'.)

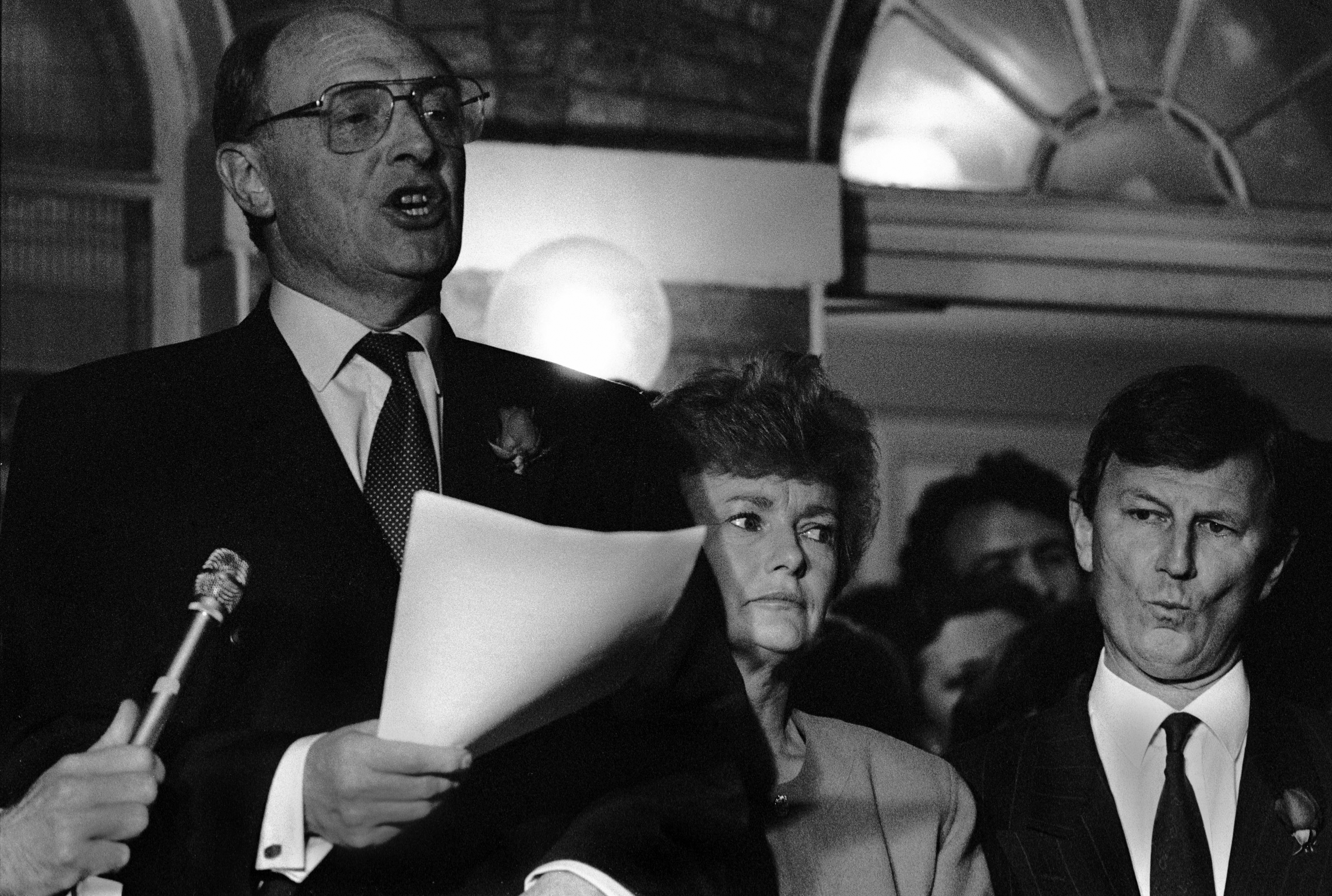
Labour Leader Neil Kinnock conceding defeat in 1992. His wife Glenys and Bryan Gould to the right of the picture.

Despite this it was widely thought that after 13 years of uninterrupted Conservative rule Labour would win the election. During the campaign both parties were either tied or within one point of each other in opinion polls, leading to uncertainty over who would win – or whether there would be an outright election winner at all. On the night of the election, exit polls indicated a very slim Labour lead, which most observers predicted would translate into either a hung parliament or a small Labour majority, with Major's best hope of retaining power being with the Tories remaining in government as a minority government or as part of a coalition. Despite these predictions the Conservatives won the election outright, gaining in excess of 14 million votes, the highest popular vote ever recorded by a British political party in a general election to date. However, due to the vagaries of Britain's 'first past the post' electoral system the victory translated poorly into a much-reduced majority of 21 seats in the House of Commons (down from a majority of 102 seats at the previous election). Though this was enough for Major to remain as prime minister and gave the Conservatives their fourth consecutive election victory, the relatively small majority would go on to cause problems for Major throughout his second term. Furthermore, Chris Patten, Major's closest aide and confidant, lost his Bath seat to the Liberal Democrats. (Note: Patten was subsequently sent to Hong Kong, becoming the colony's last British Governor.) Following the election Kinnock resigned as head of the Labour Party, to be replaced by John Smith. Major's second honeymoon as prime minister following his election victory did not last long, with the events of 'Black Wednesday' in September seriously damaging the government's reputation for economic competence.

=== Economy ===
The early part of Major's premiership coincided with a recession, which saw unemployment hit 3 million at its peak along with a raft of business closures and home repossessions. Inflation had also reached 10.9% in mid-1990. The recession had a knock-on effect on the government's fiscal position, as they had to spend more (to cover the increase in unemployment benefit claimants) at a time of declining tax intake. Furthermore, the government's commitment to the European Exchange Rate Mechanism (ERM) constrained its ability to cut interest rates and thereby stimulate the economy.

The UK's forced withdrawal from the ERM in September 1992 was succeeded by a partial economic recovery, with a new policy of flexible exchange rates, allowing lower interest rates and devaluation, thereby increasing demand for UK goods in export markets. An inflation target of 1–4% was introduced, which was maintained throughout Major's time in office. The recession was declared over in April 1993, when the economy grew by 0.2%. Unemployment also started to fall; it had stood at nearly 3 million by the end of 1992, but by the spring of 1997 it had fallen to 1.7 million. However, the government's 1993 budget, which saw a raft of tax increases, including on domestic fuel, came in for severe criticism, as not raising taxes had been one of the key planks of their 1992 electoral campaign. However, economic growth in Britain would continue largely unimpeded until the 2008 banking crash and the onset of the Great Recession.

Other economic reforms of the Major years include the relaxation on Sunday opening for shops (via the Sunday Trading Act 1994), as well as the growth in the use of private finance initiatives (PFIs) to help fund public infrastructure projects. The effectiveness of PFIs has been contested, though the idea was enthusiastically taken up by Tony Blair and their use expanded considerably during his term in office.

The power of trade unions continued to decline during the 1990s, with union membership continuing to fall concurrent with their influence on the political process. Further curbs on union activities were made in 1992 with the Trade Union and Labour Relations Act. The National Economic Development Council and Wage Councils were also abolished under Major, further eroding union influence over economic policy making. These trends were strengthened by the growth in globalisation and Britain's continued shift from an industrial, manufacturing-based economy to a more service-based one. Major sought to create a less cumbersome, more agile labour market that could compete more effectively in the new global economy, hence his insistence in the Maastricht negotiations on gaining opt-outs from EU social policies which were seen as interfering with this process. Additionally, efforts were made to reform the benefit system with the introduction of Jobseeker's Allowance (JSA) in 1996, which aimed to incentivise the unemployed to find work and tackle so-called 'benefit scroungers.' Critics of these reforms say that they have created a culture of low-pay, insecure working conditions and an unduly restrictive benefits system which has worsened inequality. However, the decline in trade union influence over left-wing politics also had the knock-on effect of increasing support for Labour by making them appear more electable.

==== 'Black Wednesday' ====
On 16 September 1992, the UK was forced to exit the European Exchange Rate Mechanism (ERM), a day which would come to be known as 'Black Wednesday', with billions of pounds wasted in a futile attempt to defend the value of sterling. The upheaval caused by the day's events was such that Major came close to resigning as prime minister, preparing an unsent letter of resignation addressed to the Queen.

The pound had been facing pressure for several months before Black Wednesday, with Britain's trade deficit widening and the pound slipping in value against the German Deutsche Mark (from May–August 1992 it had dropped from DM 2.91 to 2.80). Low interest rates in America were pushing many investors to buy Deutschmarks, and German government spending was high following reunification in 1990, putting pressure on the pound and other currencies such as the Italian lira. During this period Major asked German chancellor Helmut Kohl to ask the Bundesbank (the German central bank) to ease the situation, but the Bundesbank was independent of the government, and on 16 July it raised interest rates and the discount rate. In late July Major and his chancellor Norman Lamont seriously discussed the options of either devaluing the pound or leaving the ERM so that domestic interest rates could be cut, but they decided not to. Instead both continued to pressure Kohl and the Bundesbank to cut the German interest rates; however, their pleas were ignored and relations deteriorated. In early September Lamont raised a £7 billion loan to aid the pound, but the pressure in the markets continued, with the Finnish markka falling on 9 September followed by the Italian lira on the 13 September. Investors, convinced that Britain would be next to leave the ERM, continued selling pounds. On the day of Black Wednesday itself (16 September) the government repeatedly raised interest rates (up to 15%) in a bid to stay in the ERM, to no effect; later that evening a humiliated Lamont announced to the press that Britain would be leaving the ERM.

Although Major continued to defend Britain's membership of the ERM, stating that "the ERM was the medicine to cure the ailment, but it was not the ailment", the disaster of Black Wednesday left the Government's economic credibility irreparably damaged. Labour leader John Smith attacked Major in the House of Commons, stating that he was "the devalued Prime Minister of a devalued government." Nevertheless, Major kept his economic team unchanged for seven months after Black Wednesday, before eventually sacking Norman Lamont, replacing him with Kenneth Clarke. This came after months of press criticism of Lamont during his 1993 budget and a heavy defeat at a by-election in Newbury. His delay in sacking Lamont was exploited by Major's critics both inside and outside of his party, who used it to claim Major was too indecisive. Immediately after Black Wednesday, the Conservatives fell far behind Labour in the opinion polls and Major would never be able to regain the lead for the rest of his time as prime minister, being trounced in local council elections and the 1994 European Parliament election on the way, as well as suffering a string of by-election defeats which gradually wiped out the Conservative majority.

==== Privatisation of coal ====
Major sought to continue Thatcher's policy of privatising state-owned industries; he firmly ruled out schools and the National Health Service (NHS), focusing instead on rail, coal and postal services. There were numerous exploratory attempts at privatising Royal Mail, a pet cause of Michael Heseltine, but the issue was deemed too politically sensitive and was shelved in 1994. (Note: Royal Mail was later privatised under David Cameron in 2013.) Major instead focused on coal, with many pits loss-making and requiring a large state subsidy to continue in operation. After a review British Coal announced a raft of pit closures on 13 October 1992, which would result in the loss of 30,000 jobs. The severity of the cuts programme resulted in a huge public backlash and was opposed by the Labour Party, as well as many Conservatives angry at the perceived betrayal of Union of Democratic Mineworkers (UDM), which consisted largely of miners who had refused to join the 1984 miners strike. The miners held a large protest march in London later that year, and the Major government announced a review of some mine closures, extra funding for affected areas, as well as a more generous redundancy package for those miners who would lose their jobs. Nevertheless, the privatisation programme went ahead in 1994.

==== Privatisation of British Rail ====
Margaret Thatcher had blanched at the idea of privatising British Rail, though some basic exploratory work on the issue had been conducted from 1990, and the Conservatives' 1992 election manifesto contained a commitment to privatise British Rail. From 1994 to 1997 the railways were privatised, being split up into franchises to be run by the private sector and a company called Railtrack which was responsible for the network's infrastructure (track, signals, tunnels etc.). The process was opposed by Labour, the Liberal Democrats and even many Tories. The effect of privatising the railway is still disputed, with a large growth in passenger numbers and increasing fiscal efficiency matched by a continuing large public subsidy, high ticket prices, often severe overcrowding and concern about foreign companies running British railways. Better received was the Channel Tunnel, which opened in 1994, linking France and the UK directly via rail for the first time.

=== Crime ===
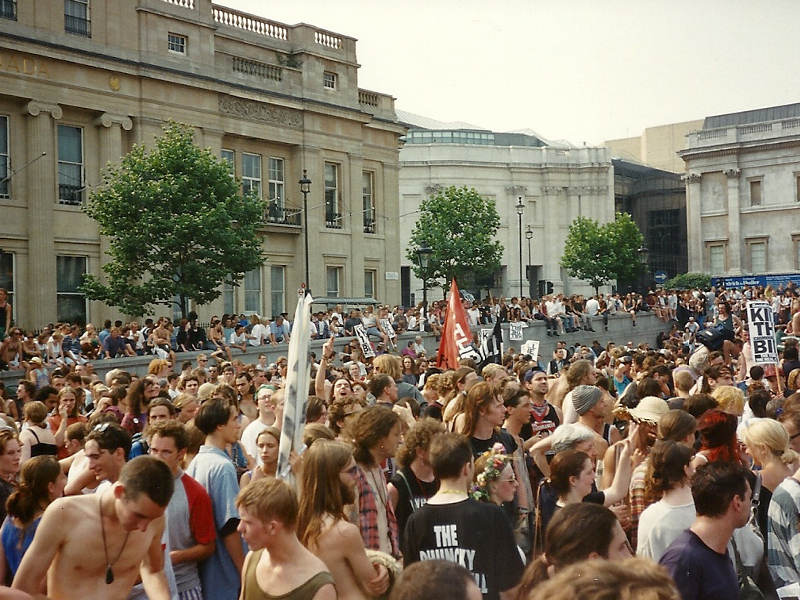
A protest against the Criminal Justice and Public Order Act in London, July 1994

Major's government was generally seen as hard-line on law and order issues, especially after Michael Howard became Home Secretary in 1993. Howard aimed to reform a criminal justice system he saw as being overly lenient on offenders, famously stating that "prison works", and over the course of the decade prisoner numbers grew by a third. The controversial Criminal Justice and Public Order Act was passed in 1994 which aimed to crack down on New Age travellers, squatters, fox hunt saboteurs and illegal raves, (Note: The Act famously defined rave music as any "wholly or predominantly characterised by the emission of a succession of repetitive beats.") as well as ending the 'right to silence' of an accused person, allowing for inferences to be drawn from their silence, and increasing police powers of 'stop and search'. Police numbers and the use of CCTV also increased during the 1990s. These initiatives took place against a background of public and media concern with high crime levels, aided by the media's depiction of a seemingly lawless 'underclass', with such high-profile crimes as the killing of the toddler James Bulger by two young boys in February 1993 and the murder of headteacher Philip Lawrence as he attempted to stop an attack on one of his pupils in December 1995. The rise in the number of single mothers was also touted as evidence of moral decay in society by many Conservatives, and the Child Support Agency was created to chase absentee fathers failing to financially contribute to their children's upbringing. Severe curbs on handguns were also brought in on the recommendation of the Cullen Enquiry, set up following a school shooting in Dunblane, Scotland in 1996 in which 16 children and a teacher were shot dead.

Despite the tough line on crime there were several notable failures during Major's time in office. The increase in prisoner numbers resulted in overcrowding, prompting break-outs at Whitemoor Prison in 1994 and Parkhurst Prison in 1995. 1991 saw the freeing of the Birmingham Six, six Irishmen wrongfully convicted in 1975 for the Birmingham pub bombings, coming a year after the freeing of the Guildford Four and Maguire Seven who had been prosecuted in similar circumstances. Subsequently, a Royal Commission on Criminal Justice was established, which resulted in the establishment of the Criminal Cases Review Commission in 1997 to investigate alleged miscarriages of justice. Controversy also focused on London's Metropolitan Police after a bungled undercover investigation into the murder of Rachel Nickell in 1992, in which the force seemingly attempted to smear an innocent man via the use of a 'honey-trap' operation, as well the catalogue of police failures following the killing of black teenager Stephen Lawrence, with a subsequent enquiry deeming the force to be 'institutionally racist'.

=== Culture, sport and social policies ===
Major took a keen interest in culture, the arts and sport whilst in office, after a low ebb for the sector during the Thatcher era, bringing these areas together in a newly created Department of National Heritage in 1992, dubbed 'the department of fun' by its first Secretary David Mellor. Major also spearheaded the launch of the National Lottery in 1994, run by the Camelot Group, the proceeds of which went to support charities, the arts and heritage projects across the country. Despite some initial concerns at the high levels of pay for Camelot executives, and controversy that some funds went towards what were seen as overly high-brow projects (such as refurbishing the Royal Opera House), the Lottery did result in a huge source of additional funding for the cultural sector.

Major was also keen to focus attention on sports, authorising the publication of a government policy document entitled 'Sport: Raising the Game'; efforts were made to encourage physical education (PE) in schools and provide greater funding for sporting bodies. The somewhat parlous state of Britain's sporting prowess was shown up by Britain's poor showing at the 1996 Summer Olympics in Atlanta; some have credited Major's spending increases and greater government support as contributing to Britain's better performances in subsequent decades. Major also backed Manchester's (unsuccessful) bid to host the 2000 Summer Olympics. (Note: The games were ultimately awarded to Sydney, Australia.)

The Major Government's planned set of celebrations in 1994 for the 50th anniversary of D-Day were scaled back after aspects of them were criticised as being inappropriate, However, the commemorations in 1995 of the end of the Second World War were generally well received. As part of the commemorations Major travelled to France, Poland, Russia and Germany to pay his respects on behalf of Britain.

Major was seen as being more socially liberal than many Conservatives, and certainly more so than Margaret Thatcher. He had little tolerance for racism, having spent part of his youth living in Brixton and having also worked in Nigeria for a period; for example, he actively supported John Taylor in his campaign to be MP for Cheltenham in 1992, which was opposed by several Conservative members allegedly due to Taylor's being black. Major was also supportive of gay rights, despite homophobia at that time being widespread both in the Conservative Party and wider society. In 1991 he met with the actor Ian McKellen, an actor and gay rights activist, to discuss issues facing the gay community, to the criticism of some in his party and the right-wing media. Major later removed restrictions on employing gay people in the civil service and army, and in 1994 the age of consent for gay men was lowered from 21 to 18. (Note: However, the age of consent was still higher than that for heterosexuals, which was set at 16. The age of consent was later equalised in 2000 under Tony Blair.)

In terms of the rights of disabled people, the government suffered an embarrassing setback after it was revealed that the Civil Rights (Disabled Persons) Bill in 1994 had been deliberately sabotaged by Conservative MPs (possibly with the government's backing) due to the expense it would have laid on businesses charged with providing full access to their premises to disabled persons. After a public outcry, notably from astrophysicist Stephen Hawking, a less stringent act (the Disability Discrimination Act) was passed the following year which outlawed discrimination but without the requirement to provide access.

=== Education ===
Major continued with the reforms in the education sector began under Thatcher with the Education Reform Act 1988; as part of this he pushed for the creation of grant-maintained schools which were outside the control of Local education authority (LEAs). Schools were also given greater powers to specialise in certain subject areas, thus creating greater choice for parents and pupils. In 1992 league tables for schools began to be published and an independent schools inspectorate (Ofsted) was created, both with the aim of improving standards in line with the Citizen's Charter initiative. Powers were granted to enable 'failing' schools to be taken over from LEA control. Many of these reforms, as well as the compulsory testing of pupils, were opposed by teaching unions, and there were testing boycotts in 1993. Major and Education Secretary Gillian Shephard pressed on, the sector being regarded by them as too left-leaning and complacent in the face of low standards, to the detriment of pupils. This analysis was seemingly confirmed when it was revealed that several senior Labour politicians - notably Harriet Harman - sent their children to private schools. Despite being keen to return to traditional standards in schools, Major did, however, oppose a proposition to reintroduce caning in autumn 1996.

In the tertiary sector the split between universities and polytechnics was ended with the Further and Higher Education Act in 1992, with most polytechnics re-branding themselves as universities. Over the course of his premiership university student numbers continued to grow, with a third of school-leavers going on to study at degree level by the time he left office.

Major had also introduced a nursery voucher scheme so as to guarantee some form of preschool for 3- to 4-year-olds, and he planned to extend the scheme had he won the 1997 general election.

=== Health ===
Reforms of the National Health Service (NHS) were also introduced under Major, with spending increases leading to a broad fall in waiting times. Attempts were made to introduce a form of 'internal market' and semi-autonomous NHS Trusts within the NHS so as to improve performance, but these were opposed by Labour and the British Medical Association as being a form of privatisation 'by the back door'. Controversy was also engendered after attempts by Health Secretary Virginia Bottomley to streamline London's hospitals, which would have meant closing the historic St Bartholomew's; after a public outcry the plans were significantly scaled back.

==== BSE outbreak ====
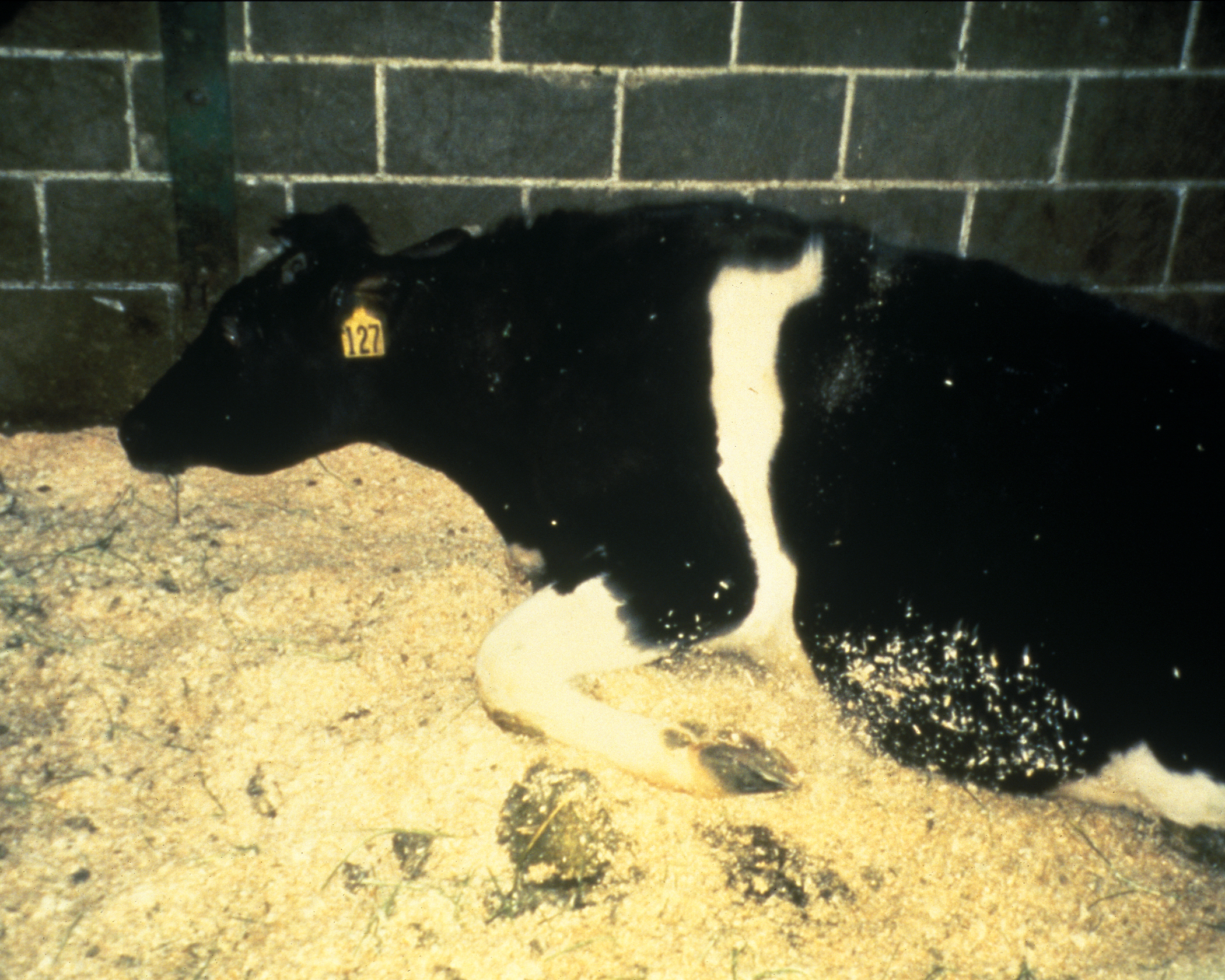
A cow suffering from BSE

In March 1996 Major had to deal with a serious public health scare following a scientific announcement of a possible link between bovine spongiform encephalopathy (BSE, colloquially referred to as 'mad cow disease') and a form of Creutzfeldt–Jakob disease (vCJD), a serious and potentially fatal brain disease in humans. The press reported heavily on the issue, resulting in a steep fall in the amount of beef bought in the UK. Soon after the EU banned imports of British beef into other member states and then the wider world, much to Major's fury, as almost all potentially risky meat had been previously destroyed. A huge cattle slaughter programme was introduced in a bid to restore faith in Britain's beef industry, but the EU ban remained in place, and was later extended to cover various bovine-derivative products as well. As a result, in May 1996 Major decided to withhold British cooperation on all EU-related matters until the beef situation had been resolved. After some progress was made in negotiations Major ended the non-cooperation stance in June. Further cattle culling took place, though the ban on British beef was not lifted until August 1999, two years after Major left office. As of 2014, 177 people in Britain had died of vCJD.

=== Local Government ===
Relations between central and local government had been poor in the 1980s, with Margaret Thatcher seeking to rein in the excesses of so-called 'loony left' councils. Major, backed by Environment Secretary Michael Heseltine, continued to push forward with local government reform, with several unloved creations of the 1970s (such as Humberside, Avon and Hereford and Worcester) being abolished and split up, often into new Unitary Authorities (UAs), which were designed to streamline council services and dispense with the old two-tier council system. Further UAs were created throughout the 1990s (notably Rutland), and the system was later extended to cover the whole of Scotland and Wales.

Efforts were also made by Michael Heseltine to tackle urban blight with the use of City Challenge funding and later the Single Regeneration Budget. Several of the 1960s-70s council estates were by now in a poor state of repair, and efforts were made to demolish the worst of them and encourage a greater mixture of tenure in these areas via Housing action trust schemes. The 'right-to-buy' legislation bought in under Thatcher was extended with the 'rent-to-mortgage' scheme, whereby council tenants could take a form of shared ownership of the property.

==== Scotland ====
The government under Margaret Thatcher had been deeply unpopular in Scotland, boosting support for Scottish devolution and independence. Major opposed devolution, arguing that it would merely be a stepping stone to full independence and the eventual break-up of the United Kingdom. Major was also sensitive to the potential risks of stoking English resentment, due to issues such as the West Lothian question and the greater per capita public spending in Scotland. Major set out his pro-union message in a speech in Glasgow on 22 February 1992, later making the theme a key one in his 1992 general election campaign, stating that "The United Kingdom is in danger. Wake up my fellow countrymen, wake up before it's too late". That election saw the Conservatives gain a slight rise in Scottish seats, from 9 to 11. Despite being opposed to devolution, Major did agree to devolve some additional powers to the Scotland Office and the Scottish Grand Committee in 1993, as well taking the symbolic step of returning the Stone of Scone to Edinburgh in 1996. (Note: The ancient stone had for centuries formed part of the coronation ceremony of Scotland's monarchs, but had been taken by England's King Edward I in 1296 and worked into his coronation chair.) However, the moves failed to improve Conservative prospects in Scotland; the party was wiped out in the 1995 local elections, and in the 1997 general election they failed to win a single Scottish seat following Labour's promise of a referendum on a Scottish Parliament.

==== Wales ====
Wales, where support for devolution was much weaker, presented less of a worry to Major than Scotland; some additional powers were granted to the Welsh Grand Committee, and the Welsh Language Act was passed in 1993 which strengthened the status of Welsh in public life. As in Scotland, Conservative support in Wales ebbed away during Major's time in office, with most voters changing to Labour who championed the idea of an autonomous Welsh Assembly. Conservative prospects in Wales were not aided by Welsh Secretary John Redwood, who was unpopular in Wales and, in Major's words, "did not take to the Welsh people, nor they to him." (Note: The relationship was memorably symbolised by footage of Redwood attempting to sing the Welsh national anthem in 1993, despite clearly not knowing the words.)

=== Northern Ireland peace process ===
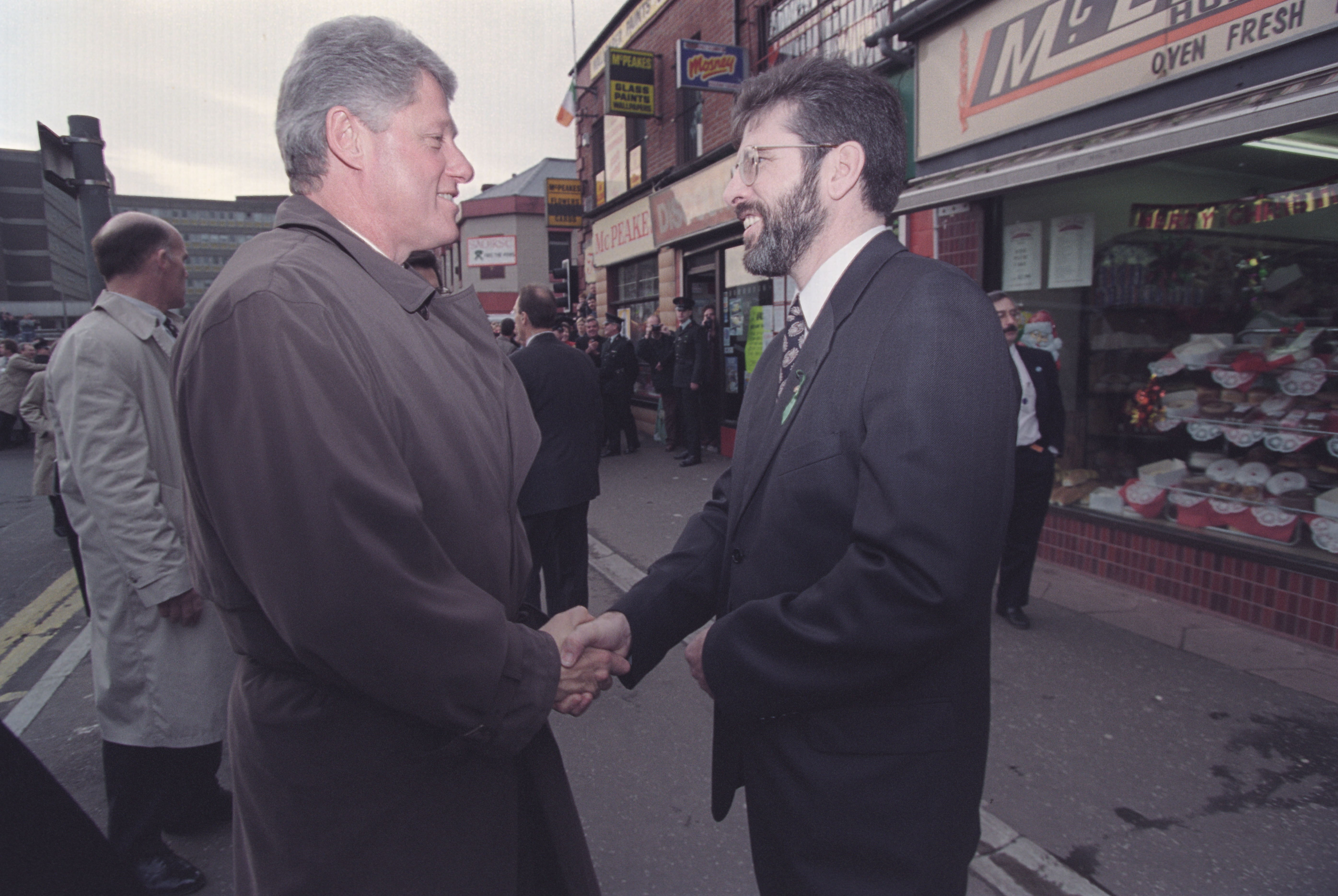
US President Bill Clinton shaking hands with Sinn Féin leader Gerry Adams in Belfast, November 1995. Clinton's decision to grant a US visa to Adams provoked an angry reaction from Major.

Upon taking office 'The Troubles' in Northern Ireland had been raging for 20 years with no end in sight; despite the fact that the issue held little political gain in mainstream British politics, and the entrenched divisions between Nationalists and Unionists were viewed by many as being hopelessly intractable, Major made Northern Ireland "one of my highest priorities," stating that a similar level of violence would not be tolerated if it was occurring in England. The conflict visited Major personally soon after taking office, when in February 1991 the Provisional Irish Republican Army (IRA) fired a mortar at 10 Downing Street during a Cabinet meeting, almost killing him. Though some damage was done to the building there were no casualties, and later that month Major undertook his first visit to the Nation.

Little progress had been made with peace talks in the 1980s, with Margaret Thatcher largely viewing the conflict as a security issue, and her main attempt at a peace deal (the Anglo-Irish Agreement) gaining little whilst encountering fierce Unionist opposition. In 1990 Northern Ireland Secretary Peter Brooke stated publicly that Britain had no "selfish strategic or economic interest" in Northern Ireland and would accept Irish unification, if the majority of people in Northern Ireland so wished it. In March 1991 tentative peace talks began involving the main 'constitutional' parties of Northern Ireland (i.e. those who adopted purely democratic means, thereby excluding Gerry Adams's Sinn Féin which supported the IRA's use of violence). The talks would focus on three stands: restoring internal self-government to Northern Ireland on a power-sharing basis, relations between Northern Ireland and the Republic of Ireland, and relations between the UK and the Republic of Ireland.

Despite declaring to the House of Commons in November 1993 that "[to] sit down and talk with Mr Adams and the Provisional IRA ... would turn my stomach", the British government were in fact conducting secret 'back channel' discussions with the IRA. Thinking within Republican circles had been evolving in the 1980s, with the clear failure of the 'armed struggle' to achieve a united Ireland and the increasing electoral success of Sinn Féin indicating that their aims could perhaps be better realised politically. Gerry Adams had also been exploring options for a peaceful way forward with John Hume, leader of the Social Democratic and Labour Party (SDLP), then the largest Nationalist party in Northern Ireland. In February 1993 Major had received a message from the IRA stating that "The war is over, but we need your help to end it." Nevertheless, discussions faltered over the precise terms of the Sinn Féin/IRA entry into peace talks and the decommissioning of arms; frustrated at the slow progress of negotiations, Sinn Féin leaked the existence of the back channel to the media in November 1993, severely embarrassing the British government. The IRA continued its armed campaign throughout this period, with killings and bombings in Northern Ireland almost a daily occurrence, resulting in retaliatory attacks by Loyalist paramilitaries (the Shankill Road bombing and subsequent Greysteel massacre in October 1993 being one of the deadliest of such tit-for-tat killing cycles). The IRA also took its campaign to mainland Britain, aiming to increase pressure on the British government; the most notable of these attacks were the bombing of London's Baltic Exchange in April 1992, a bomb in Warrington in March 1993 which killed two young boys, and the Bishopsgate bombing in April 1993.

Discussions were also being held with Albert Reynolds, the Irish taoiseach (prime minister), with whom Major had a friendly relationship. This resulted in the Downing Street Declaration of 15 December 1993, in which both governments publicly committed themselves to Irish unification only with the consent of a majority of the people in Northern Ireland (i.e. effectively giving the Northern Irish Unionists a veto on a united Ireland) and the inclusion of any non-violent party in peace talks (paving the way for Sinn Féin to enter talks if the IRA decommissioned its weapons). Though opposed by the hardline Democratic Unionist Party (DUP) of Ian Paisley, the declaration was cautiously welcomed by Sinn Féin, the SDLP and the Ulster Unionist Party (then the largest Unionist party in the province). On 31 August 1994 the IRA declared a ceasefire, followed by Loyalist paramilitaries on 13 October. A broadcasting ban on Sinn Féin was also lifted in both Britain and the Republic of Ireland. Controversy continued, however, over the future decommissioning of the IRA's military arsenal.

Following the seeming momentum of 1993–94, progress then slowed. Reynolds was replaced by John Bruton as Taoiseach in November 1994, and David Trimble became the leader of the UUP (replacing James Molyneaux) in August 1995. Major was incensed when US president Bill Clinton granted Gerry Adams a visa to visit the States in January 1994, despite Adams not yet having ruled out the IRA's continuing use of violence; after Adams visited the country in March 1995 Major refused to answer Clinton's phone calls for several days. A Joint Framework Document on a possible future peace settlement was launched in February 1995, though it was rejected by the UUP and DUP as being excessively 'green'. Talks also foundered over arms decommissioning, with the issue being referred to George J. Mitchell (United States Special Envoy for Northern Ireland), resulting in the 'Mitchell Principles', which reiterated that all paramilitaries should disarm. The Sinn Féin/IRA interpretation of this was that they could join peace talks whilst simultaneously negotiating on decommissioning (the so-called 'twin track' approach), but this was opposed by Major and the Unionist parties. With negotiations stalled, the IRA ended its ceasefire on 9 February 1996 by bombing the London docklands. A further massive bomb destroyed the centre of Manchester in June 1996. The year wore on with little progress being made, with the uncertainty caused by the looming UK general election (which the Conservatives were widely tipped to lose) meaning that little headway could be made. However, Major's dedication to the peace process was vital in establishing the building blocks which led to the Good Friday Agreement under his successor Tony Blair in 1998, which finally brought an end to 'the Troubles'. Despite their often strained relationship, Northern Ireland was an issue on which Major and Blair agreed wholeheartedly, and Blair later invited Major to the pro-Good Friday Agreement campaign trail in 1998. In his memoirs, Major wrote that "working for a Northern Ireland settlement was the most difficult, frustrating and, from 1993, time-consuming problem of government during my premiership. It was also the most rewarding. I have never regretted my decision to get involved in such a direct way."

=== Back to Basics and 'sleaze' ===
At the 1993 Conservative Party Conference, Major launched the 'Back to Basics' campaign, which he intended to be about a wide variety of issues including the economy, education and policing, but which to Major's chagrin was interpreted by many (including some right-leaning Conservative cabinet ministers) as a call for a return to traditional moral and family values that they associated with the Conservative Party. To Major's dismay the tabloid press gleefully latched onto the latter interpretation, as a seemingly endless series of sexual and financial scandals (given the catch-all term 'sleaze') hit the party over the subsequent years, starting with National Heritage Secretary David Mellor, who was forced to resign in September 1992 after allegations of an affair. Several such scandals centred on supposed Conservative moral hypocrisy, such as Tim Yeo, Minister for the Environment and Countryside, who had fathered an illegitimate child despite having publicly lambasted single mothers and broken families, and MPs such as Michael Brown and Jerry Hayes who were alleged to have conducted homosexual relationships with then underage men; as well as alleged corruption in the Conservative Party, as with the abuse of the 'Right to buy' housing scheme by millionaire MP Alan Duncan, and the 'Homes for votes scandal' in Conservative-controlled Westminster City Council.

In the Pergau dam affair the government was found to have acted unlawfully in granting aid to an economically unviable project in Malaysia, as a sweetener for the potential sale of arms to that country.

In addition to the above one-off scandals, many of which were quickly forgotten, there were several on-going 'sleaze'-related stories such as 'Arms-to-Iraq', which was an enquiry into how government ministers, including Alan Clark, (Note: Clark was also involved in an unrelated scandal involving the revelation of an affair with the wife and both daughters of a South African judge.) had encouraged a business called Matrix Churchill to supply arms-manufacturing machinery to Iraq during the Iran–Iraq War of the 1980s, in breach of the official arms embargo. It was alleged that senior ministers had, on legal advice, attempted to withhold evidence of this official connivance via the use of public interest immunity certificates when the directors of Matrix Churchill were put on trial for breaking the embargo. Major set up the Scott enquiry to look into the matter, at which Major himself gave evidence in 1994, which issued a final report in 1996 which was highly critical of the government's handling of the issue.

Another ongoing scandal was 'Cash for Questions', in which Conservative MPs (first Graham Riddick and then David Tredinnick) accepted money to ask questions in the House of Commons in a newspaper "sting". Later the MPs Tim Smith and Neil Hamilton were found to have received money from Mohamed Al-Fayed, also to ask questions in the House. The MP David Willetts later resigned as Paymaster General after he was accused of rigging evidence to do with 'Cash for Questions'. Although Tim Smith stepped down from the House of Commons at the 1997 general election, Neil Hamilton sought re-election for his seat, being defeated by former BBC Reporter Martin Bell who stood as an anti-sleaze candidate, with both the Labour and Liberal Democrat candidates withdrawing in his favour. As with 'Arms-to-Iraq' Major set up an independent enquiry into the matter under Michael Nolan, which resulted in the establishment of the Committee on Standards in Public Life. An initial report recommended a limit on outside work and transparency in earnings by MPs, angering some Conservative MPs into voting against it, which further muddied the party's image in the popular consciousness. Further public anger arose over the so-called 'revolving door' of Conservative ex-ministers taking high-paying jobs in companies they had helped privatise whilst in office.

Major later commented in his memoirs on the "routine" with which he would be telephoned over the weekend to be warned of the latest embarrassing story due to break. He wrote that he took a stern line against financial impropriety, but was angered at the way in which a host of scandals, many of them petty sexual misdemeanours by a small number of MPs, were exploited by the press and Opposition for political advantage. He also conceded that the issue "fed the public belief that the Conservative(s) ... had been in government too long, and had got into bad habits" and quoted Labour's claim in 1997: "Nothing better encapsulates what people think of this government. Sleaze will be one of the things which brings this government down."

=== 1995 leadership election ===
Following his 1992 election victory Major's fortunes took a turn for a worse, with the ignominy of 'Black Wednesday' and the bruising battles to pass the Maastricht Treaty exposing the increasingly acrimonious divisions within the Conservative Party. Major's own personal ratings in opinion polls were low, and he was now being reviled on an almost daily basis by newspapers whose support the Conservatives had once taken for granted. Critics from all corners were also attacking his 'consensus' approach to politics, with Norman Lamont, after being sacked as chancellor delivering a stinging critique of Major's government in the House of Commons on 9 June 1993, stating that it "gives the impression of being in office but not in power." In addition to the above, a string of defeats at by-elections, the European elections in June 1994 and local elections in May 1995 saw a severe decline in support for the Conservatives. There were constant rumours of a leadership challenge, exacerbated in June 1995 when the second part of Margaret Thatcher's memoirs were published, containing a chapter which was fiercely critical of Major's premiership. On 13 June 1995 Major had an extremely ill-tempered meeting with right-leaning backbenchers, which Major cites as the moment he decided on a leadership contest, stating that "the situation as it stood was intolerable to me personally, and corrosive to the party." The situation was not helped when, a few days later at a G7 summit in Canada, Major was overheard to have stated to German chancellor Helmut Kohl that "I run a coalition of government of my own." On 22 June 1995, tired of the continual threats of leadership challenges that never arose, Major resigned as Leader of the Conservative Party and announced that he would contest the resulting leadership election, telling his opponents that "it is time to put up or shut up"; he continued to serve as prime minister whilst the leadership was vacant. John Redwood resigned as Secretary of State for Wales to stand against him, with some hoping he would act as a 'stalking horse' candidate, clearing the way for a more substantial figure such as Michael Portillo or Michael Heseltine to enter a second round. (Note: When it emerged that Portillos's supporters had rapidly installed a large number of new telephone lines in a potential campaign headquarters, Major quipped in the House of Commons "that the speed at which these matters can be done is a tribute to privatisation".) The Sun newspaper, still at this stage supporting the Conservative Party, had lost faith in Major and declared its support for Redwood, running the front-page headline "Redwood versus Deadwood". The vote took place on 14 July, with Major winning by 218 votes to Redwood's 89, with 12 spoiled ballots, eight 'active' abstentions and two MPs abstaining, enough to easily win in the first round. The amount was three more than the target he had privately set himself, having earlier resolved to resign if he could not carry the support of at least 215 of his MPs, the two-thirds threshold of his own parliamentary party. Following his victory Major conducted a mini-reshuffle, replacing Redwood with William Hague as Welsh Secretary, promoting Michael Heseltine to deputy prime minister, and moving Michael Portillo to Defence.

=== 1997 general election defeat ===
There was a brief boost in Major's fortunes following his victory in the self-declared leadership election in 1995. However, this did not last, and his premiership continued to be undermined by Conservative MPs defecting to other parties, further by-election defeats, ongoing 'sleaze'-related scandals and party disunity, most notably over Europe. By December 1996 the Conservatives had lost their majority in the House of Commons. Meanwhile, the Labour Party, re-branded as 'New Labour' by its new leader Tony Blair (John Smith having suddenly died in May 1994), seemed vibrant and fresh; having shifted decisively to the political centre (notably with the jettisoning of Clause Four of the party constitution, which committed them to common ownership of industry), it seemed a much more appealing prospect to many floating voters. Labour remained far ahead in the opinion polls as the general election loomed, despite the economic boom and swift fall in unemployment that had followed the end of the early 1990s recession (later dubbed a 'voteless recovery' for the Tories).

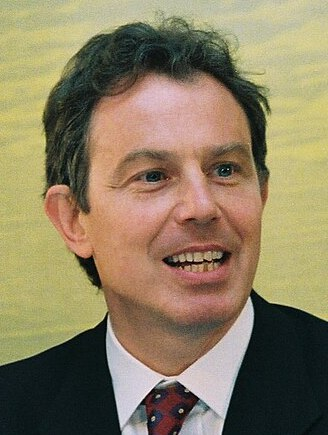
Tony Blair (pictured in 1997), leader of the Labour Party, succeeded Major as Prime Minister after the 1997 election.

Major faced 1997 knowing that he would have to call an election at some point before May. He considered conducting an early election in March, but decided against it following a Conservative defeat at a by-election in Wirral in February. On 17 March Major announced that the election would be held on 1 May, hoping that a long campaign would enable him to benefit from the continuing economic recovery and expose 'New Labour' as a shallow marketing gimmick, via the slogan 'New Labour, New Danger'. However, Major refused to conduct a 'dirty campaign', only reluctantly green-lighting the infamous poster showing Blair with 'demon eyes', and vetoing the use of a similar TV advert showing Blair making a Faustian-style pact with a shadowy spin doctor.

In his memoirs Major admitted that he knew the election was a lost cause from the outset: "people believed Labour were bound to win before the campaign even started. They were right." Major stated that the public were tired of 'sleaze' and Conservative Party bickering over Europe, and following the fourth consecutive Conservative election victory in 1992 even he thought that they had perhaps "stretched the democratic elastic too far." His main hope was that Labour's margin of victory could be kept relatively small, enabling the Conservatives to regroup and fight to win the next election. The hope proved to be forlorn, with support for the Conservatives being further eroded by the fielding of several candidates by the Referendum Party, founded by billionaire James Goldsmith on a platform of leaving the EU. The 'cash-for questions' scandal continued to focus unwelcome attention on Tory 'sleaze' (focused especially on Neil Hamilton, who to Major's annoyance refused to resign and continued to fight the election), with the opposition accusing Major of proroguing Parliament earlier than usual so as to delay the publication of a report into the scandal. There was also only lukewarm support for Major from the Tory press, with The Sun switching its support to Labour.

Major launched the Conservative manifesto on 2 April (entitled 'You Can Only be Sure with the Conservatives'), which lauded the performance of the economy, and proposed tax benefits for married couples, pensions reform and a referendum on the Euro. The latter proved particularly divisive, with many Conservative candidates publicly condemning Major's 'wait and see' policy on the single currency, prompting him to implore them not to "bind my hands when I am negotiating on behalf of the British nation." Major also brought back his soapbox, hoping to recapture some of the spirit of the 1992 campaign, though with little success. Labour meanwhile ran a much slicker professional campaign, with a highly organised media team under Alastair Campbell ensuring that all its candidates were consistently on message. An electoral pact with the Liberal Democrats in parts of the country further aided their cause.

As the results came in after the vote on 1 May 1997, it became clear that Labour had won by a landslide, with the Conservative Party suffering the worst electoral defeat by a ruling party since the Reform Act 1832. In the new Parliament, Labour held 418 seats, the Conservatives 165, and the Liberal Democrats 46, giving Labour a majority of 179; it was the lowest number of Conservative seats in Parliament since 1906, and the new political landscape appeared likely to guarantee Labour at least two successive parliamentary terms in government. Major himself was re-elected in his own constituency of Huntingdon with a reduced majority of 18,140, but 133 other Conservative MPs were defeated, including present and former Cabinet Ministers such as Norman Lamont, Malcolm Rifkind, David Mellor and Michael Portillo. The huge election defeat also left the Conservatives without any MPs in Scotland or Wales for the first time in history. The party would not return to government until 2010 (and then only in coalition with the Liberal Democrats), and would not win a parliamentary majority until 2015.

The following day Major formally handed his resignation as prime minister to Queen Elizabeth II. Shortly before this, he had announced his intention to also resign as Conservative Leader, giving his final statement outside 10 Downing Street in which he said that "the incoming government will inherit the most benevolent set of economic statistics of any incoming government since before the First World War" and that "when the curtain falls, it is time to get off the stage – and that is what I propose to do." Major then announced to the press that he intended to go with his family to The Oval to watch Surrey play cricket.

== International ==
Major's premiership coincided with a period of profound change in the international landscape, with the collapse of the USSR ending the Cold War, continued economic globalisation, the end of apartheid in South Africa and a continued push for European integration, though there were also serious conflicts in the Middle East, Africa and the Balkans. Though aware that Britain was no longer the dominant global player it once was, Major sought to continue the pursuit of a proactive foreign policy so that Britain could continue to 'punch above its weight' on the international stage.

Major used the end of the Cold War to justify cuts to the defence budget in 1993, which saw the scrapping of some long-standing regiments of the British Army. (Note: Major also put the intelligence services MI6 and GCHQ on a legal footing for the first time.) Adjusting to new realities, Britain and France increased their military cooperation in this period. However, both countries maintained their nuclear deterrent capabilities.

Major also sought to ensure Britain remained engaged with international organisations such as the European Community (renamed the European Union from 1993), the United Nations (where Britain remained one of the five members of the UN Security Council) and the Commonwealth. Major pushed for reform of the UN (still operating within the basic framework of its founding in 1945), so that it would better reflect the modern balance of power, but little progress was made in this area. Britain also enthusiastically pushed for greater economic globalisation, joining the newly formed World Trade Organization in 1995 following the successful conclusion of the General Agreement on Tariffs and Trade's 'Uruguay Round' in 1993. Major also sought to promote the peaceful resolution of international conflicts, supporting the Arab-Israeli peace process (Note: This conflict visited Britain directly in July 1994, when Palestinian terrorists attempted to blow up the Israeli embassy in London with a car bomb.) and efforts to end the conflict in the former Yugoslavia. He also sought to reach out to areas traditionally neglected by Britain, for instance in 1992 he became the first British prime minister in 50 years to visit South America, going to Colombia and attending the Earth Summit in Brazil.

Despite the active foreign policy, Major often found himself frustrated with the ostentatious summits he was compelled to attend, viewing many of them as "gilt-edged boondoggles" where he was obliged to "listen to interminable speeches before signing up to pre-cooked conclusions much longer on verbiage than action." The G7 summits were notorious in this regard, with the elaborate ceremony of the 1993 summit in Tokyo coming in for particular criticism. Major found US president Bill Clinton to be in sympathy with him on the matter, and the following summits (such as in Naples, Italy in 1994 and Halifax, Canada in 1995) were much more scaled-back, informal, and in Major's view productive, affairs.

=== Gulf War ===
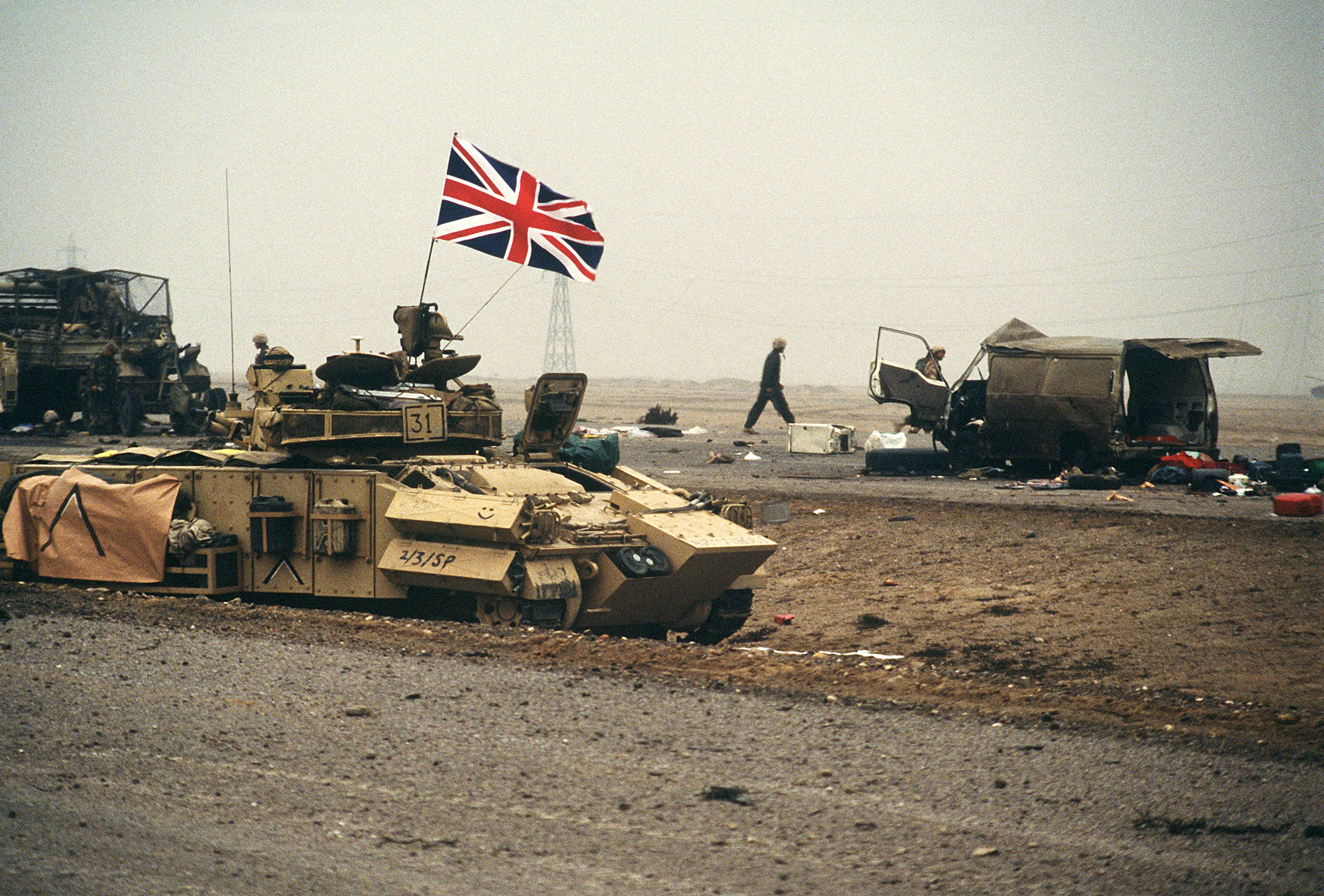
A British Armoured Personnel Carrier in Kuwait during the Gulf War

Upon becoming prime minister Major immediately had to deal a major war in the Middle East. Under President Saddam Hussein, Iraq had annexed oil-rich Kuwait in August 1990, and there were fears that he might seek to expand the conflict to Saudi Arabia or Israel. The UN had authorised the use of force if necessary, with this being backed by the other major British political parties and approved by the House of Commons in September 1990 and January 1991. Operating under US tactical command, some 45,000 British troops were sent to the Gulf; they were inoculated due to fears that Hussein would use chemical and biological weapons. Major visited US president George HW Bush in December 1990, assuring him of complete British support. Major also travelled to the Gulf in January 1991, speaking with British troops stationed in Saudi Arabia and meeting the Kuwaiti government in exile, as well the leaders of Saudi Arabia, Oman and Egypt.

Under United Nations Security Council Resolution 678, Iraq was given a deadline of 15 January 1991 to withdraw from Kuwait. The deadline passed with Iraqi forces still occupying Kuwait, and an air campaign was launched by US and coalition forces on 16 January, with the ground war beginning on 24 February. The swift campaign was successful and a ceasefire was declared on 28 February, with Iraqi forces pushed over the border and the conflict contained with the immediate region, despite Iraqi attempts to draw Saudi Arabia and Israel into the conflict. Despite the largely one-sided nature of the conflict, 47 British troops were killed, and enormous environmental damage was caused as retreating Iraqi forces set fire to Kuwait's oilfields. The allied troops did not push on to Baghdad and remove Hussein, as this was not endorsed by the UN resolution; there were hopes that internal revolts would succeed in unseating him, but these were brutally crushed and Hussein remained in power. (Note: Hussein would remain in power until he was removed by a US-led coalition during the 2003 Iraq War.) A series of sanctions were placed on Iraq, and Major pushed for the creation of no-fly zones in southern and northern Iraq, thereby enabling Kurdish forces in the north to establish a de facto autonomous zone and avoiding further massacres. Within Britain, a national thanksgiving service to commemorate those who had died in the conflict was held at Glasgow Cathedral in May 1991.

He maintains good relations with the Gulf monarchies, even congratulating the sultan of Oman, Qaboos ibn Said, for the adoption in 1996 of a law designed to strengthen his powers.

=== Europe ===
In 1991 Major stated that he wished to see Britain "at the very heart of Europe", though he was a pragmatist on European integration, favouring the pooling of sovereignty on issues where he felt it made practical sense to do so (such as the single market), but opposing the single currency, a common defence policy or anything else that smacked of federalist over-reach. However, Major found himself caught between a largely (though not entirely) Eurosceptic Conservative Party (backed by a vocal Margaret Thatcher) and press, and the more federalist vision of several of his European counterparts. In the lead-up to the 1991 Maastricht Treaty negotiations Major, with the backing of the Cabinet, made it clear that he would be unable to sign Britain up to either to a single currency or the Social Chapter of the Treaty. The negotiations proceeded in December 1991, with France, Germany, the Netherlands and the European Economic Community (EC) itself all pushing for a more federal future for the EC (symbolically recognised at Maastricht by renaming the EC the 'European Union'). After protracted discussions, opt-outs for Britain from both the Social Chapter and single currency were achieved, as well as ensuring that foreign and defence policy were kept as matters of inter-governmental co-operation, with Major claiming to have won "game, set and match for Britain".

The Maastricht process was thrown into chaos after being rejected by Denmark in a referendum in June 1992, casting doubts on whether a similar referendum in France would pass later that year. The French vote in September passed – just – and Major thus prepared to ratify the treaty in Parliament. Moves towards greater European integration met with vehement opposition from the Eurosceptic wing of Major's party and his Cabinet, evident at the rambunctious Conservative Party Conference in October 1992 - held a few weeks after sterling's ejection from the Exchange Rate Mechanism on Black Wednesday - with pro-EU members (such as Kenneth Clarke, Michael Heseltine and Douglas Hurd) and Eurosceptics (such as Norman Tebbit) both receiving rapturous applause from their respective supporters.

The divisions only worsened in the first half of 1993, with each stage of the Maastricht bill's reading being opposed or blocked by Eurosceptic Conservatives. Although Labour supported the treaty, they tactically opposed certain of its provisions so as to exploit divisions in the Government. This opposition included passing an amendment that required a vote on the Social Chapter aspects of the Treaty before the Treaty as a whole could be ratified. On 22 July 1993, several Conservative MPs, known as the Maastricht Rebels, voted for this amendment so as to block the wider ratification, and the Government was defeated. Major called another vote on the following day, which he declared as a vote of confidence (the loss of which would have required him to call a general election). He won the vote but severe damage had been done to his authority in Parliament and within the Conservative Party.

The following day Major gave an interview to ITN's Michael Brunson. During an unguarded moment when Major thought that the microphones had been switched off, Brunson asked why he did not sack the ministers who were conspiring against him. He replied: "Just think it through from my perspective. You are the Prime Minister, with a majority of 18 ... where do you think most of the poison is coming from? From the dispossessed and the never-possessed. Do we want three more of the bastards out there? What's Lyndon B. Johnson's maxim?" (Note: The maxim referred to is Johnson's comment about J. Edgar Hoover. Johnson had once sought a way to remove Hoover from his post as head of the Federal Bureau of Investigation (FBI), but upon realising that the problems involved in such a plan were insurmountable, he accepted Hoover's presence philosophically, reasoning that it would be "better to have him inside the tent pissing out, than outside pissing in".) Major later said that he had picked the number three from the air and that he was referring to "former ministers who had left the government and begun to create havoc with their anti-European activities", but many journalists suggested that the three were Peter Lilley, Michael Portillo and Michael Howard, three of the more prominent Eurosceptics within his Cabinet. Throughout the rest of Major's time as prime minister the exact identity of the three was blurred, with John Redwood's name frequently appearing in a list along with two of the others. The tape of this conversation was leaked to the Daily Mirror and widely reported, embarrassing Major and further inflaming tensions within the Conservative Party.

Early in 1994 Major vetoed the Belgian politician Jean-Luc Dehaene's succession to Jacques Delors as President of the European Commission, deeming him to be excessively federalist, only to find that he had to accept a Luxembourger politician of similar views, Jacques Santer, instead. Around this time Major – who in an unfortunate phrase denounced the Labour Leader John Smith as "Monsieur Oui, the poodle of Brussels" – also tried to block an increase in the Qualified Majority needed for voting in the newly enlarged EU (which would make it harder for Britain, in alliance with other countries, to block federalist measures). After Major had to back down on this issue the MP Tony Marlow called openly in the House of Commons for his resignation, with Major himself calling the climb-down "a humiliating retreat."

In November 1994, during a Commons vote on an EU finance bill, eight MPs rebelled against the government. Major had stated that the bill was a confidence matter and he withdrew the whip from them, effectively expelling them from the Party (plus a ninth who had later sided with the rebels). Hoping to heal the divisions caused by the episode, Major re-admitted the rebels in April 1995, only for them to openly continue their Eurosceptic activities. Newly elected Labour leader Tony Blair seized on the episode, saying of Major at Prime Minister's Questions that "I lead my party, he follows his."

For the rest of Major's premiership the main European fault-lines were the BSE controversy and whether Britain would join the single currency, scheduled to be launched in 1999. Some leading Conservatives, including Chancellor Kenneth Clarke, favoured joining, whilst large numbers of others expressed their reluctance or outright opposition to joining. Major adopted a 'wait and see' policy, refusing to rule out the possibility of joining at some point in the future if it was in Britain's economic interest to do so, and proffering the option of a referendum on the issue. By this time billionaire Sir James Goldsmith had set up his own Referendum Party, siphoning off some Conservative support, and at the 1997 General Election many Conservative candidates were openly expressing opposition to joining.

=== Bosnian War ===
Major's premiership coincided with the collapse of Yugoslavia and the resulting war in Bosnia and Herzegovina (and parts of Croatia). Tensions between the constituent republics of Yugoslavia had been building since the death of President Josip Broz Tito in 1980, exacerbated by the political uncertainty caused by the collapse of Communism across Eastern Europe in the period 1989–91. In June 1991 both Slovenia and Croatia declared independence; whilst the Serb-dominated central government in Belgrade let the almost homogeneous Slovenia leave after only a brief war, the situation in Croatia, parts of which contained large numbers of ethnic Serbs, was much more contested. The EU, at Germany's insistence, recognised the independence of the two states in December 1991. War broke out between Serbia (led by the nationalist Slobodan Milošević) and Croatia (ruled by Franjo Tuđman) over the Serb-populated region of Slavonia region in north-east Croatia, prompting the UN to send in a peacekeeping force (UNPROFOR). The fiercest fighting, however, occurred following the declaration of independence by Bosnia and Herzegovina under President Alija Izetbegović on 6 April 1991; the mountainous republic's population was split between Bosnian Serbs, Bosnian Croats and Bosnian Muslims (or 'Bosniaks'), and full-scale civil war broke out between them, with the Bosnian Croats and Bosnian Serbs backed by Tuđman and Milošević respectively. The war caught Europe and the world unawares, and shocking scenes of POW camps (likened by some to Nazi concentration camps), huge refugee flows and campaigns of ethnic cleansing began to be broadcast over the world, leading to calls for intervention.

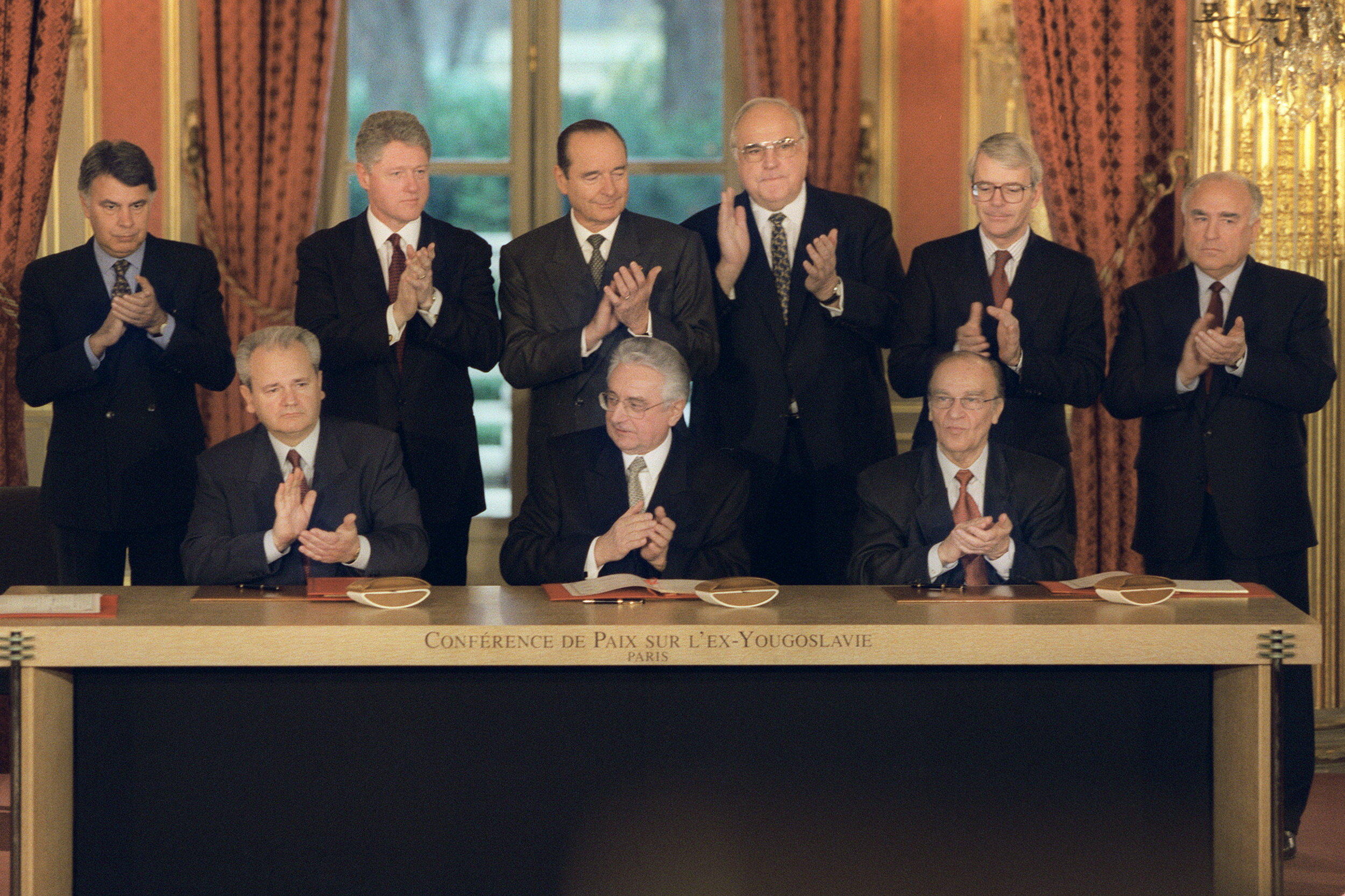
Major at the final signing of the Dayton Agreement in Paris in 1995, which ended the Bosnian War

Major discussed the worsening crisis at a Cobra meeting held in August 1992, where Britain's top military advisers stated that only an enormous 400,000-strong troop deployment would have any kind of decisive effect. At a conference held in London later that month, Britain agreed with France to deploy a much more limited force charged with protecting refugees. The force was deployed in November 1992, with Major visiting the area in December. The US administration had been distracted by the election that year, though it became more involved following the inauguration of President Bill Clinton in 1993. However, there were serious disagreements between Britain and the US over how to handle the crisis, causing tensions in the "special Relationship". British government policy (under Foreign Secretary Douglas Hurd) was to maintain the UN arms embargo, which restricted the flow of weapons into the region, and to oppose airstrikes against Bosnian Serbs. Hurd's reasoning was that lifting an arms embargo would only create a so-called "level killing field" and that airstrikes would expose UN and Anglo-French peacekeepers to Serb retaliation. The Clinton administration, by contrast, was committed to a policy of "lift and strike" (i.e. lifting the arms embargo and inflicting airstrikes on the Serbs where necessary), but was opposed to any wide-scale NATO troop deployment. British policy was criticised by various commentators as a form of "amoral equivalency", because it appeared to judge the Bosnian Government and the Bosnian Serbs equally culpable. Hurd's hardline realist position on the conflict, in which Bosnia was not seen to be within Britain's strategic interest, was harshly criticised by those of a more interventionist mindset, notably Margaret Thatcher, who saw the Bosnian Muslims as being the main victims of the conflict and therefore entitled to access to armaments. (Note: In 2011 the then-Defence Secretary Malcolm Rifkind accepted that the arms embargo was a "serious mistake" by the UN.)

The conflict dragged on throughout 1993 and 1994. NATO began conducting limited airstrikes against Bosnian Serb forces in 1994, prompting them to capture some UNPROFOR troops as hostages in May 1995. In July 1995 roughly 8,000 Bosniak males were murdered in Srebrenica by Serb forces, despite supposedly being in a UN 'safe haven'. A subsequent increase in Anglo-French forces (known as the Rapid Reaction Force) and UN troops, aided by a more coordinated campaign of NATO airstrikes, as well as the military stalemate between the various militias on the ground, led to peace talks being held in Dayton, Ohio in October 1995. The subsequent peace agreement led to Croatia and Serbia recognising Bosnia's existence as an independent state, albeit one split into two 'entities' (one Serb, one Croat-Muslim) with a relatively weak central government. Up to 100,000–200,000 people had been killed in the war and British peacekeepers (as part of Implementation Force and then later the Stabilisation Force in Bosnia and Herzegovina) remained in the region for several years. (Note: A year after Major left office another war broke out in the region when Kosovo attempted to secede from Yugoslavia; this time international intervention was much swifter and a repeat of the Bosnian debacle was avoided.)

=== Diplomatic relationship with the United States ===
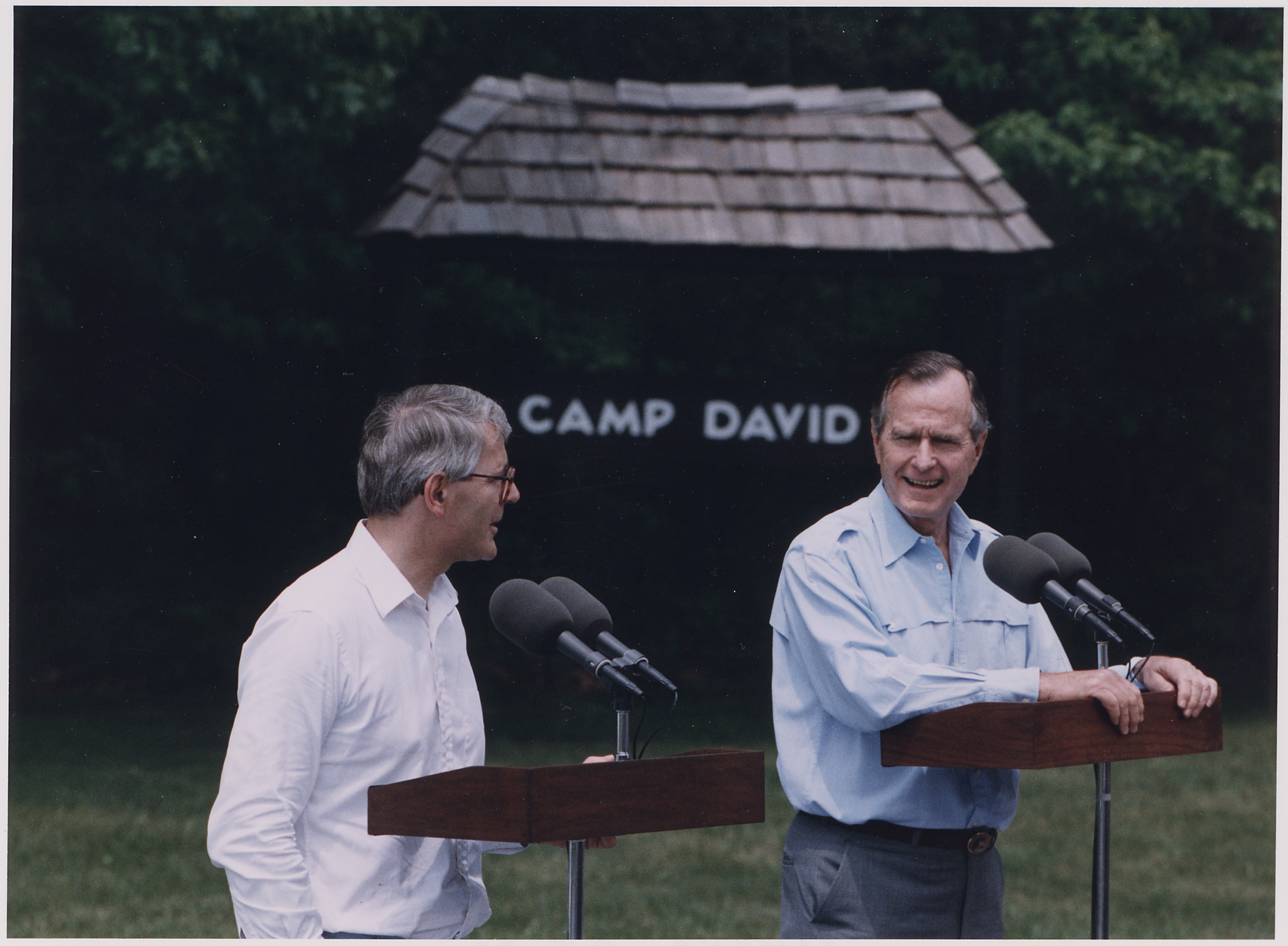
Major with President George H. W. Bush at Camp David in 1992

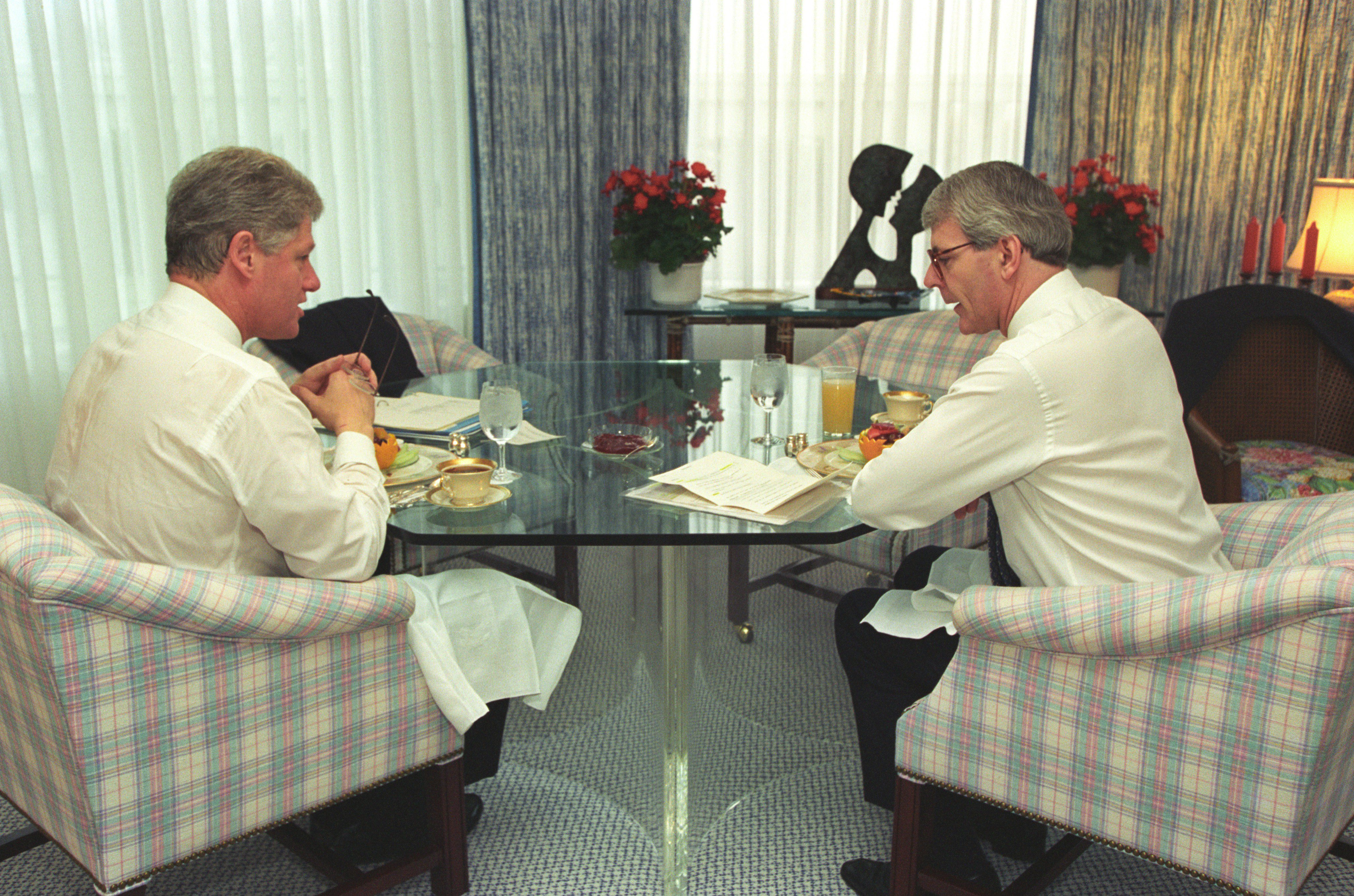
Major with President Bill Clinton at the White House Solarium in 1994

America continued to be Britain's main foreign ally during Major's time in office, which saw the emergence of the US as the world's sole superpower following the collapse of the USSR. Major enjoyed close relations with George H. W. Bush (President from 1989 to 1993), with the two establishing a close bond during the lead up to the Gulf War, in which Major pledged Britain's unconditional support. Major never quite managed to establish a similar rapport with Bill Clinton (President from 1993 to 2001). There were tensions in the relationship from the outset, when it emerged that some (fairly low-level) Conservative figures had flown to America in 1992 to support Bush's re-election campaign, as well as offering to dig up 'dirt' on Clinton stemming from his student days at Oxford University in the late 1960s. Further tensions arose over the response to the ongoing conflicts in Bosnia and Northern Ireland, with Major incensed when Clinton gave the green-light for a visit to the States by Sinn Féin leader Gerry Adams. Over time the relationship improved, with Clinton becoming only the second US president ever to address both Houses of Parliament on a state visit in November 1995.

=== Commonwealth ===
Relations within The Commonwealth improved significantly following the dismantling of apartheid in South Africa and the end of the acrimonious dispute over imposing sanctions on the country. At the 1991 Commonwealth Heads of Government Meeting (CHOGM) in Zimbabwe the organisation issued the Harare Declaration on democratic principles and peaceful development. Major steadfastly supported South Africa's transition to majority rule, conducting a state visit to the country in September 1994, with South African president Nelson Mandela visiting the UK in 1993 and 1996. At the 1995 CHOGM in New Zealand Major and Mandela strongly denounced Nigeria's execution of peaceful political activist Ken Saro-Wiwa, with the country being suspended from the Commonwealth. However, the meeting was overshadowed by disputes over French nuclear testing in the Pacific, which was supported by Major but opposed to by most other states.

Major sought to boost business links with India, with the country seeing rapid economic growth following reforms introduced in 1991. Major visited the country twice, becoming the first British prime minister to attend India's Republic Day in 1993. In 2020 it emerged that Pakistani prime minister Benazir Bhutto had asked Major to facilitate an informal meeting between her and Indian prime minister P. V. Narasimha Rao, but Rao rejected the offer.

In 1994 a genocide occurred in Rwanda, (Note: Note that Rwanda was not a member of the Commonwealth at this time, joining only in 2009.) resulting in the deaths of some 800,000–1,000,000 people. Major's government has come in for criticism in the way it responded to the killings, with declassified intelligence documents revealing that Britain was aware of the impending bloodbath, but along with the US sought to block the use of the word 'genocide' to describe the killings (which would have obligated intervention) and even to scale back the UN peacekeeping force (UNAMIR) in the country. Rwanda was deemed to be a small, remote country of no strategic value to Britain, nor indeed of any great interest to the press or public, and one furthermore that lay in France's 'sphere of influence' in Africa. Though a small contingent of British troops (under Operation Gabriel) was deployed to Rwanda in support of UNAMIR in late July 1994, by then the worst of the killing had already ended. President Clinton later apologised for his inaction during the genocide, though Major did not, and no mention of Rwanda is made in his memoirs.

=== China ===
The huge economic growth in China which began in the 1980s following the reform and opening up of Deng Xiaoping continued into the 1990s, though China had not yet reached the status of proto-superpower it would achieve in the early 21st century. In 1991 Major became the first Western leader to visit China after the Tiananmen Square massacre in 1989. Major did raise his concerns on human rights issues, but relations between the two countries were dominated by the issue of Hong Kong, a British territory due to be handed back to China in 1997. Chris Patten, the last British governor of the territory, aimed to cement democratic reforms before the handover (as with the 1994 Hong Kong electoral reform), due to concerns that Hong Kong's relatively liberal democracy would not survive the change. The territory was peacefully handed over to China on 1 July 1997 (after Major had left office), operating under a system of 'one country, two systems'.

=== Russia ===
Major's premiership coincided with the dissolution of the Soviet Union in 1991, which saw the emergence of 15 newly independent states, several of which were engaged in violent conflicts with internal separatist elements, against a background of serious economic dislocation caused by an at times chaotic transition to capitalism. Upon becoming Prime Minister Major was keen to maintain strong links with Soviet leader Mikhail Gorbachev, inviting him to a G7 meeting in July 1991. Major later firmly backed Russian president Boris Yeltsin during an attempted coup in August 1991, and supported him as Russia transitioned from Communism, writing later in his memoirs that "to disregard Russia when she was weak might not be forgotten when she was strong again." Despite tensions over Russia's handling of the war in Chechnya, there were several mutual state visits, and an Anglo-Russian friendship treaty was signed in 1992. (Note: On one such visit Major met current Russian president Vladimir Putin, then acting as a senior adviser to Anatoly Sobchak, Mayor of St Petersburg.) Major also proposed expanding the G7 to include Russia, with the G8 being formed under Major's successor Tony Blair. (Note: Russia was later suspended from the Group in 2014 following its annexation of Crimea.)

== See also ==
- First Major ministry
- Second Major ministry
- Electoral history of John Major

== Notes ==
British premierships
Preceded by Thatcher	Major premiership 1990–1997	Succeeded by Blair
