= Construction barrel =

Cylindrical marker used for traffic management

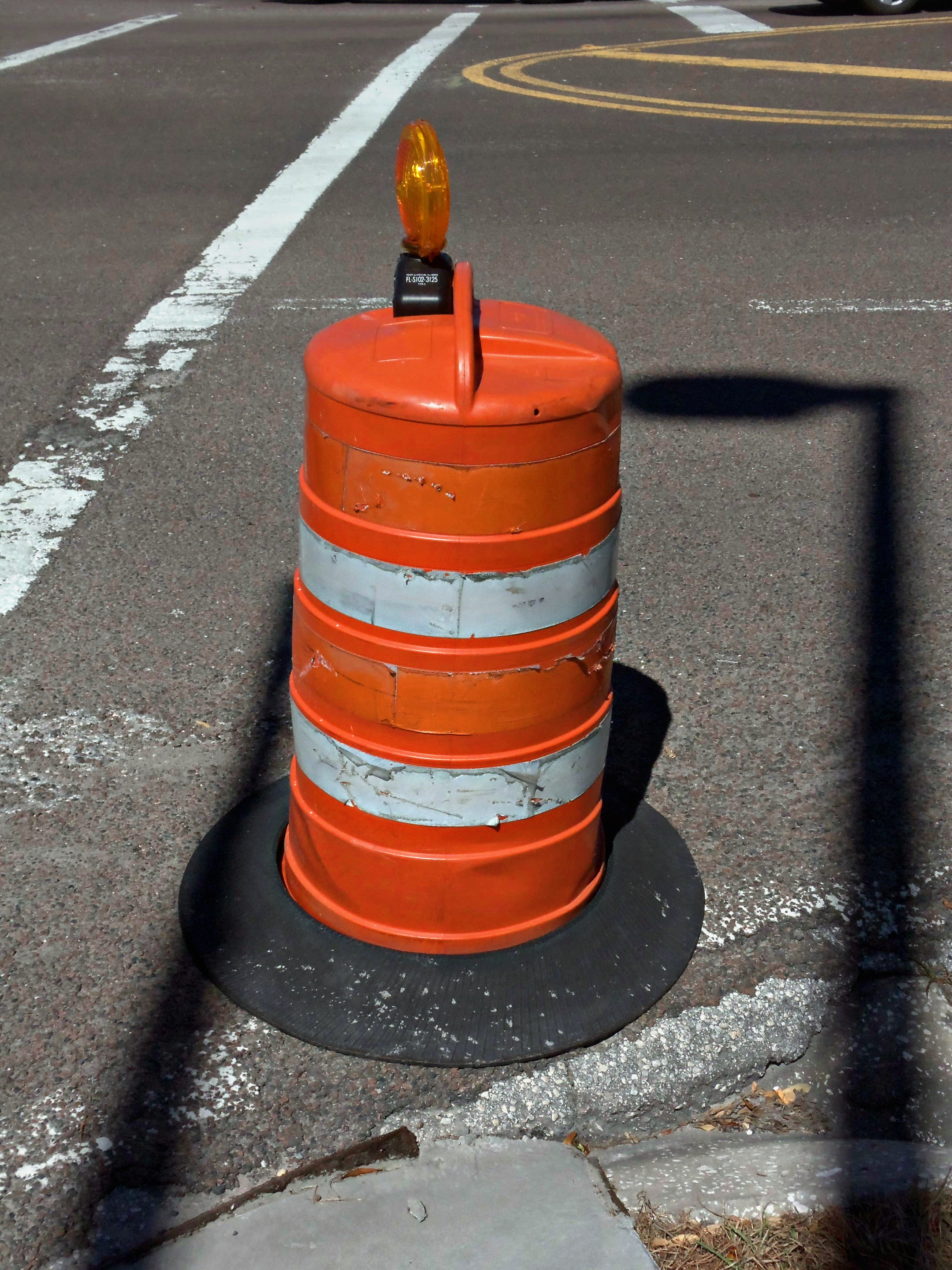
A construction barrel with a barricade light affixed to its handle in Florida

Construction barrels (colloquially known as "drums" in the United States) are traffic control devices used to channel motor vehicle traffic through construction sites or to warn motorists of construction activity near the roadway. They are used primarily in the United States, but are occasionally used in Canada, Mexico and Costa Rica. They are an alternative to traffic cones which are smaller and easily hit by vehicles. Drums tend to command more respect from drivers than cones as they are larger, more visible, and give the appearance of being formidable obstacles.

Construction barrels are typically bright orange and have four alternating white and orange reflective bands. However some regions, such as the province of Ontario, Canada, use black barrels with orange stripes. Most have a rubber base that prevents the barrel from tipping over during high winds. Construction barrels have a handle at the top so they can be easily picked up and carried. The handle also allows crews to install barricade lights to increase visibility. The product makes up a $90 million industry in the United States.

Until the late 1980s, construction crews typically used 55-gallon steel drums and wooden sawhorse-style barricades to guide traffic through construction areas. The drums were painted orange and white and filled with sand or water to keep them in place. Because the drums were steel and weighed down with sand or water, extensive damage would occur to vehicles striking them, and they were dangerous to workers if propelled into work areas by vehicles. Plastic barrels that are commonly seen on American roadways today began emerging in the late 1970s and 1980s; steel 55-gallon drums were largely phased out by the 1990s, with an outright prohibition on using metal drums appearing in the third revision of the 1988 Edition of the MUTCD, published in September 1993. For the same reasons, wooden sawhorse-style barricades were largely phased out in the early 2000s, although rubber or plastic sawhorse-style barricades remain in use in parts of the country.

By 1981, the drums were mainly a two-piece plastic design that included the top piece of the drum and a base that was filled with sandbags. The same year, an updated version of the invention was released by PSS; it included a flange to allow sandbag placement on the outside of the drum which made it easier to maneuver. In 1985, PSS released the modern-day version of the construction barrel, the LifeGard® drum. The LifeGard® utilized the sidewall of a recycled truck tire at its base to keep the drum securely in place on the roadway. This design is the most common one in use today.

== See also ==
- Bollard
- Road traffic control
- Traffic cone
