= American Traffic Safety Services Association =

Trade association

The American Traffic Safety Services Association (ATSSA) is an international trade association, located in Fredericksburg, Virginia, United States, whose core purpose is to advance roadway safety. Founded in 1969, ATSSA represents the road, traffic, and highway safety industry with effective legislative advocacy, traffic control safety training, and a far-reaching member partnership.

ATSSA's member partnerships include approximately 11,630 members, 1,450 companies, and 48 international companies. These members and numerous local chapters are designed to connect leaders, public agencies, legislative advocates, manufacturers, suppliers, and contractors to exchange information and ideas about the roadway safety industry.

== History ==
ATSSA began in 1966 when roadway safety barricade rental operators convened in Chicago to discuss industry improvements.

Out of this grew a somewhat informal association of barricade rental companies which, in 1969, became the rental division of the American Traffic Safety Control Devices Association. Later, in 1969, it was decided to form the American Traffic Services Association and the first general meeting was held in Chicago in the spring of 1970. The first annual convention was held in New Orleans in early 1971.

In 1982, the first chapter was formed in Texas. In the fall of 1983 there was interest in expanding the membership of ATSSA to include permanent sign manufacturers, and in December 1983 the Sign Manufacturing Division of ATSSA was formally organized. In December 1984 the name of the association was formally changed to the American Traffic Safety Services Association (ATSSA) in order to better describe the full scope and activities of the association. In October 1988, the association was further expanded to include a Pavement Marking Division (PMD). In November 1998, the board of directors voted to grant full voting status to the manufacturing member companies of ATSSA, and renamed this membership group the Manufacturers and Suppliers Division. Also in 1998, an ITS Council was organized. In March 2003 the Guardrail Services Division was formally organized and currently, a High Friction Surface Council is being developed. ATSSA now includes five organized divisions as well as International, Traffic Engineering & Design Firm, Individual Consultant, and Individual Manufacturers Representative members. The association's current membership totals approximately 12,800.

ATSSA's President and CEO is Roger A. Wentz, and its headquarters are in Fredericksburg, Virginia, 45 miles south of Washington, D.C.

== See also ==
- Maintenance of traffic
