= Cones Hotline =

1990s UK roadworks information service

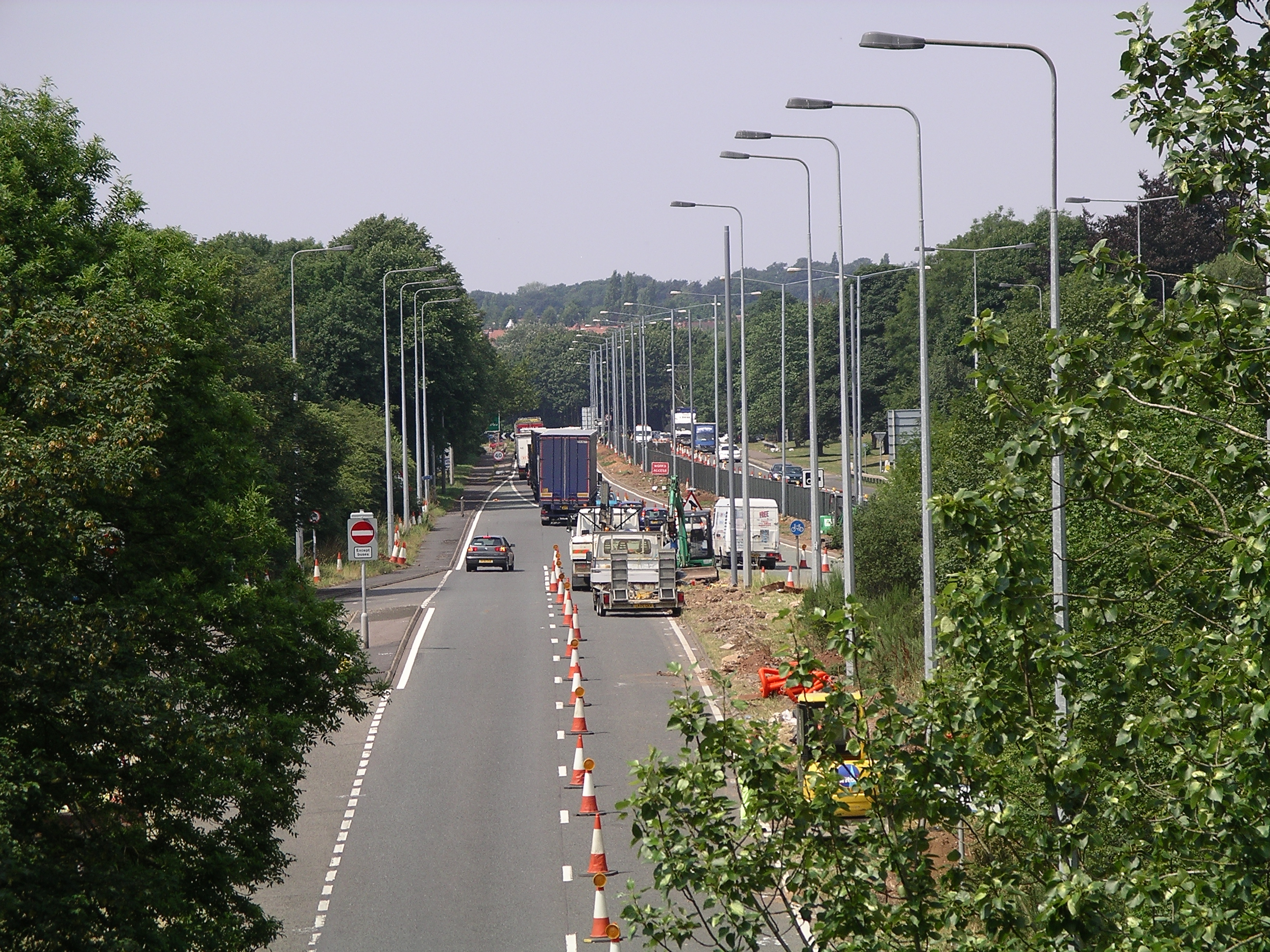
Cones on the A45 in Coventry (July 2006)

The Cones Hotline was a telephone hotline introduced by the prime minister of the United Kingdom John Major in June 1992 to allow members of the public to enquire about roadworks on the country's roads and report areas where traffic cones had been deployed on a road (to close a lane or otherwise restrict traffic flow) for no apparent reason. The telephone number for the hotline (originally 0345 504030, later 08457 504030, then 0300 1235000) was usually displayed on signs after sections of roadworks.

Between March 1994 to March 1995 the hotline was staffed by a single person during office hours and by the duty staff out of hours. It moved to an external contractor for six months, before being brought back in house in September 1995.

The hotline was widely seen as being a waste of government resources, costing several thousand pounds per year to run. In September 1995, having fielded 17,000 calls, it was announced that the hotline would transition into a new system.

== Legacy ==
=== Highways Agency Information Line ===
The hotline continued after this date, with a broader remit, and renamed as the Highways Agency Information Line or HAIL. The Highways Agency was another of Major's innovations, having been formed not long before, in 1994. The hotline was one of the first to move to the new local-rate 0845 numbers in 1996. In 2010, the Highways Agency announced the two year phase out of the 0845 number in favour of a new number, 0300 1235000. The change was to take advantage of cost savings offered by 0300 numbers. For callers, the 0300 number was treated the same as a typical geographic phone number (starting with 01 or 02) in pricing schemes by all phone companies, including mobile phones. Under the 0845 number, some charged extra to call the number. Additionally, Highways England's per minute fee on each call was now capped at 5p.

The system applies to major highways and motorways. Callers can report a breakdown, including their own, debris on the highway, other incidents or make enquiries about road conditions.

=== Other programs ===
The Cones Hotline was created as part of the Citizens Charter.

In 1998 the 5-1-1 road conditions number started to spread across the US and Canada, and was later added to the North American Numbering Plan.
