= Maintenance of traffic =

Temporary traffic control

Maintenance of traffic (MOT), also known as temporary traffic control or temporary traffic management, is a process of establishing of a work zone, providing related transportation management and temporary traffic control on streets and highways right-of-way. This process does not apply to law enforcement officers.

The establishment of a work zone and management of temporary traffic control is conducted by traffic controllers, also known as flaggers, traffic observers, or spotters. Standards of operations are established by the department of transportation of each state, and may vary from state to state.

Temporary Traffic Control or Temporary Traffic Management is critical to maintaining safety and minimizing disruption during temporary work zones, events, and other short-term traffic disruptions.

In the United States, traffic control devices are set up according to the Manual on Uniform Traffic Control Devices, sometimes along with state supplements.

Maintenance of traffic training in the United States is provided by the American Traffic Safety Services Association.
