= Barrier board =

Board used to direct or restrict traffic

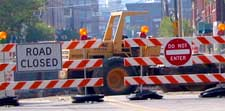
Barrier boards being used to close a road in the United States.

Barrier boards are typically long plastic or wooden beams or metal plates used during road works and similar activities to cordon off areas, close roads or direct traffic.

They are also known as council barriers, show stoppers, works barricades, or safety barricades.

== Around the world ==
- In Australia barrier boards, (council barriers or board and trestles), are 2.5m long heavy duty PVC or timber boards with yellow and black reflective stripes on both sides supported by 1 or 2 'A frame' stands/legs.
- In Europe, barrier boards are typically red and white striped boards made from PVC plastic or wood and are used in conjunction with traffic cones.
- In the United States, barriers are typically white aluminium or plastic 'A frame' devices with orange and white reflective boards on either one side or both.
- In Hong Kong, these barriers are in red and white strips; sometimes there are different uses except for road works

== See also ==
- Traffic cone
