= Traffic cone =

Cone-shaped marker used for traffic management

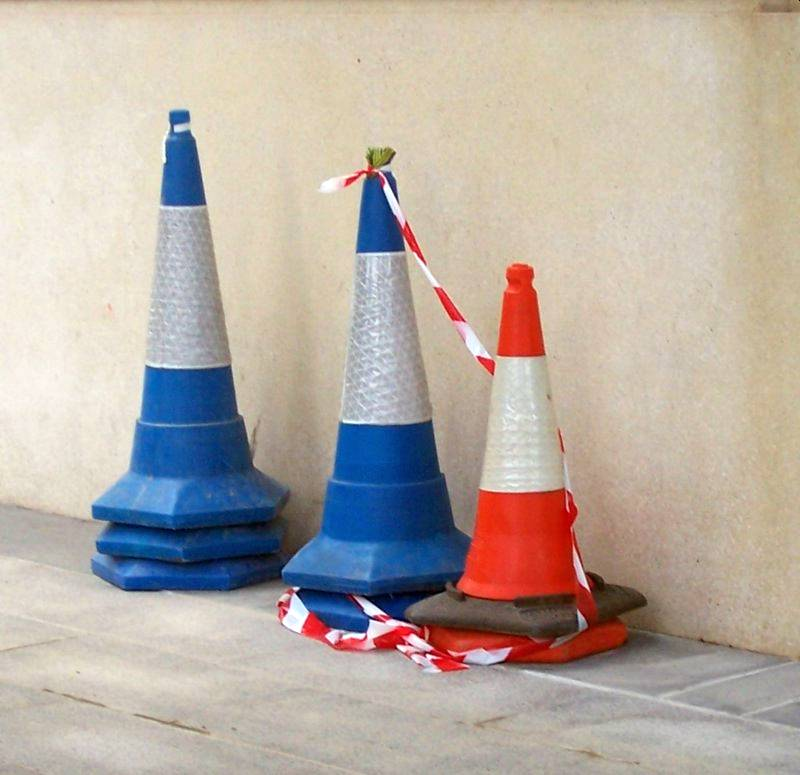
Traffic cones are usually used to divert traffic. The reflective sleeves are for nighttime visibility; the bosses at the top ease handling and can be used for attaching caution tape.

Traffic cones, also called pylons, witches' hats, road cones, highway cones, safety cones, caution cones, channelizing devices, construction cones, roadworks cones, or just cones, are usually cone-shaped markers that are placed on roads or footpaths to temporarily redirect traffic in a safe manner. They are often used to create separation or merge lanes during road construction projects or automobile accidents, although heavier, more permanent markers or signs are used if the diversion is to stay in place for a long period of time.

== History ==
Traffic cones were invented by Charles D. Scanlon, an American who, while working as a painter for the Street Painting Department of the City of Los Angeles, was unimpressed with the traditional wooden tripods and barriers used to mark roads which were damaged or undergoing repainting. Scanlon regarded these wooden structures as easily broken, hard to see, and a hazard to passing traffic. Scanlon's rubber cone was designed to return to an upright position when struck by a glancing blow. The patent for his invention was granted in 1943.

Traffic cones were first used in the United Kingdom in 1958, when the M6 motorway opened. These traffic cones were a substitute for red lantern paraffin burners being used during construction on the Preston Bypass. David Morgan of Burford, Oxfordshire, UK believes that he constructed the first experimental plastic traffic cones in 1961 while working at Imperial Chemical Industries, which replaced pyramid-shaped wooden cones previously used.

In the United States on May 1, 1959, the Pacific Gas and Electric Company in Oakland, California adopted the policy of placing orange safety cones at the left front and left rear corners of their service trucks while parked on the street to increase visibility and safety for the workers. This policy was implemented as the result of a suggestion by their employee, Russell Storch, a cable splicer. He was awarded $45 for his suggestion. This policy is still in use today.

Modern traffic cones are usually made of brightly colored thermoplastic. PVC from bottles can be recycled to make traffic cones.

== Usage ==
=== Traffic management ===
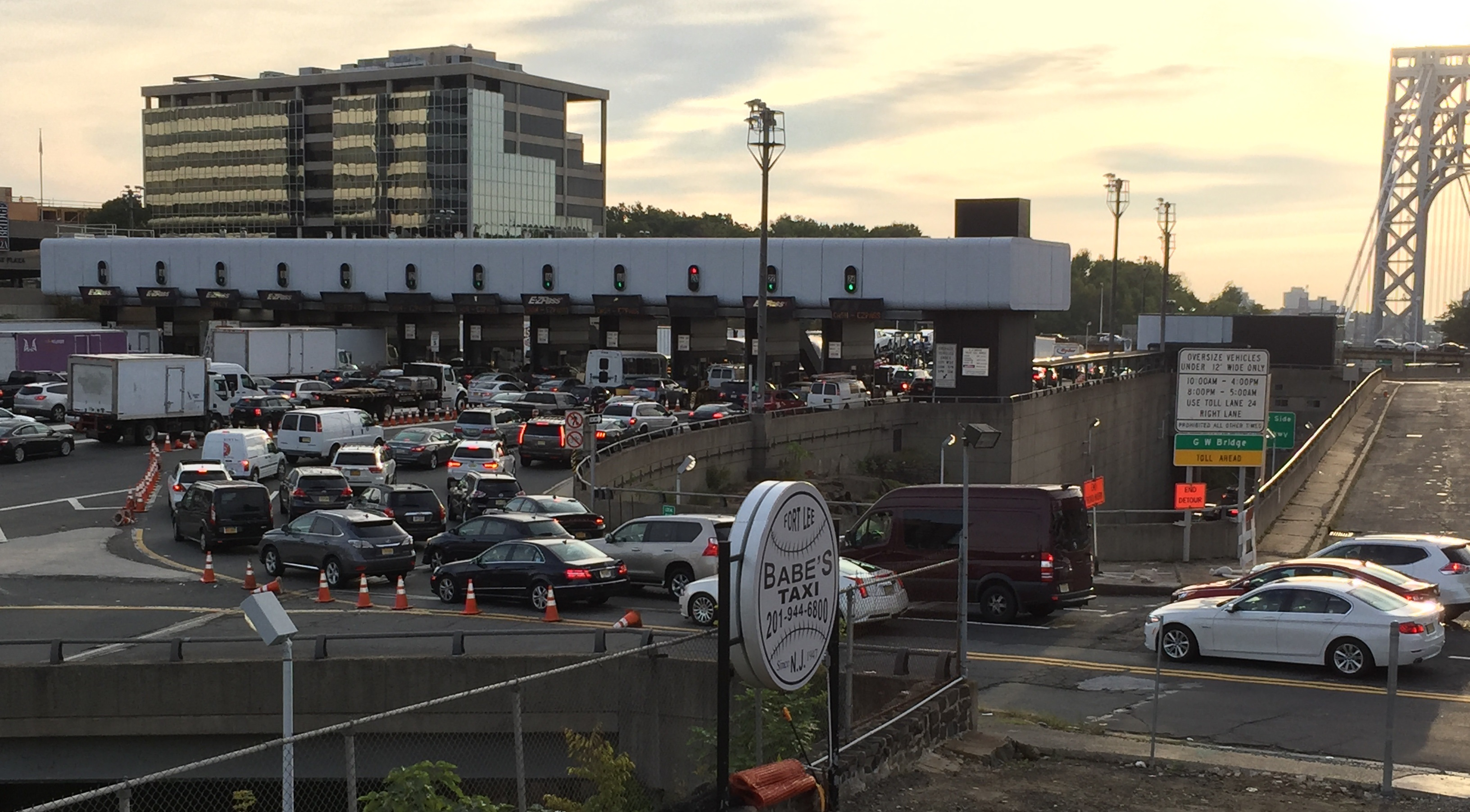
Cones in use at the "Bridgegate" entrance to the George Washington Bridge in Fort Lee, New Jersey

Traffic cones are typically used outdoors during road work or other situations requiring traffic redirection or advance warning of hazards or dangers, or the prevention of traffic. For night time use or low-light situations traffic cones are usually fitted with a retroreflective sleeve to increase visibility. On occasion, traffic cones may also be fitted with flashing lights for the same reason.

In the US, cones are required by the US Federal Highway Administration's Manual on Uniform Traffic Control Devices (MUTCD) to be fitted with reflective white bands to increase night-time visibility. Reflective collars, white strips made from white reflective plastic, slip over cones snugly, and tape or adhesive can be used to permanently attach the collars to the cones.

==== Types and sizes ====
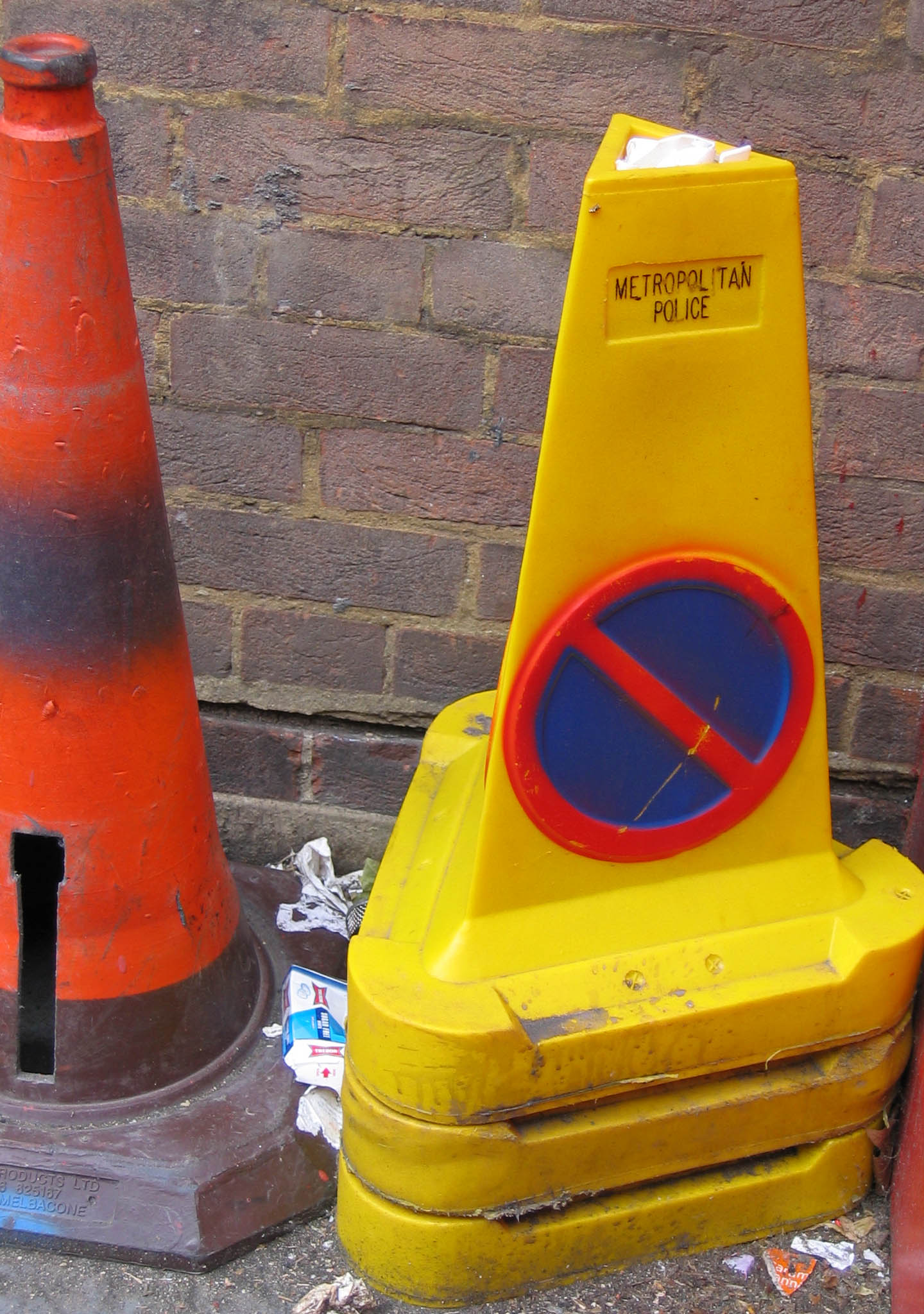
Traffic cone on the right is used to indicate that no parking is allowed (UK).

Traffic cones are designed to be highly visible and easily movable. Various sizes are used, commonly ranging from around 30 cm (11.8 in) to a little over 1 m (39.4 in). Typical traffic cones are fluorescent "safety" orange, but other bright colors including yellow, pink, red, and lime green are also used, with the color depending on context in some countries. The cones usually have a retroreflective strip (commonly known as "flash tape") to increase their visibility at night.

In the United States, they come in such sizes as:

- 12 in (305 mm), 1.5 lb (0.68 kg) – for indoor/outdoor applications
- 18 in (457 mm), 3 lb (1.4 kg) – for outdoor applications such as freeway line painting
- 28 in (711 mm), 7 lb (3.2 kg), (also called Metro cones for their use in cities) – for non-highway applications such as local streets
- 28 in (711 mm), 10 lb (4.5 kg) – for freeway/highway applications (with reflective stripes)
- 36 in (914 mm), 10 lb (4.5 kg) – for freeway/highway applications (with reflective stripes)

In New Zealand, they are compliant in two sizes for use on all roads; these are:

- 35 in (900mm), up to 16.5 lb (7 kg) - for all activities on all roads. (with two reflective stripes)
- 17.7 in (450mm), up to 16.5 lb (7 kg) - for the protection of wet road markings only (with one reflective stripe)

=== Other forms ===
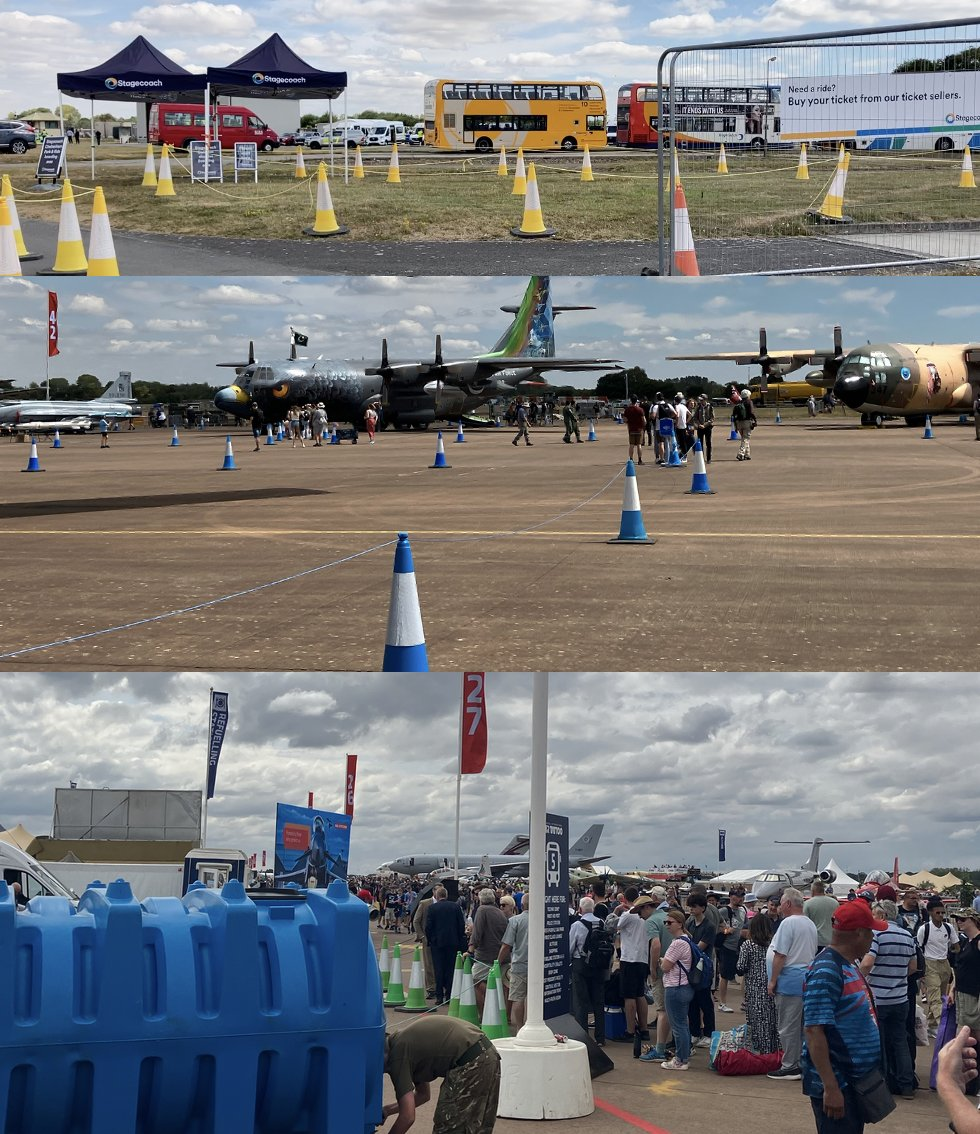
Various differently coloured traffic cones and ropes in use at RIAT 2025

Cones are easy to move or remove. Where sturdier (and larger) markers are needed, construction sites use traffic barrels (plastic orange barrels with reflective stripes, normally about the same size as a 200-liter (55 gallon) drum. When a lane closure must also be a physical barrier against cars accidentally crossing it, a Fitch barrier, in which the barrels are filled with sand, or a Jersey barrier is used.

In many countries such as Australia and in some American states such as California, traffic barrels are rarely seen; pillar-shaped moveable bollards are instead used where larger and sturdier warning or delineation devices are needed. Typically, bollards are 1,150 mm (45 in) high fluorescent orange posts with reflective sleeve and heavyweight rubber bases. Larger devices such as barrier boards may be used instead of cones where larger areas need to be excluded or for longer periods.

=== Non-traffic use ===
Cones are used to lay out courses for autocross competitions.

Cones are also frequently used in indoor public spaces to mark off areas which are closed to pedestrians, such as a restroom being out of order, or to denote a dangerous condition, such as a slippery floor. They can be used on school playgrounds to limit areas of a playing field, and on ice rinks to define class, private party, or private lesson areas. Some of the cones used for this purpose are miniature, as small as 5 cm (2.0 in) tall, and some are disposable full-size cones made of biodegradable paper.

Being distinctive, easily portable and usually left unguarded, traffic cones are often stolen. Students are frequently blamed, to the extent that the British National Union of Students has attempted to play down this "outdated stereotype".

==== In protests ====
- Protestors in Hong Kong using the method to put out tear gas canisters, October 2019
- Protesters at the 2026 Delaney Hall protests using the method to put out tear gas canisters, May 2026

In 2019, Hong Kong protesters invented a way of using traffic cones to dispose tear gas when riot police are attempting to disperse a crowd. The method works by placing a traffic cone over the gas canister to trap the gas inside the cone and then by dousing the canister with water through an opening in the top of the cone. The method has been used at protests around the world, including in Chile and the United States, after videos on social media spread of the method being used during the Hong Kong protests.

== In popular culture ==
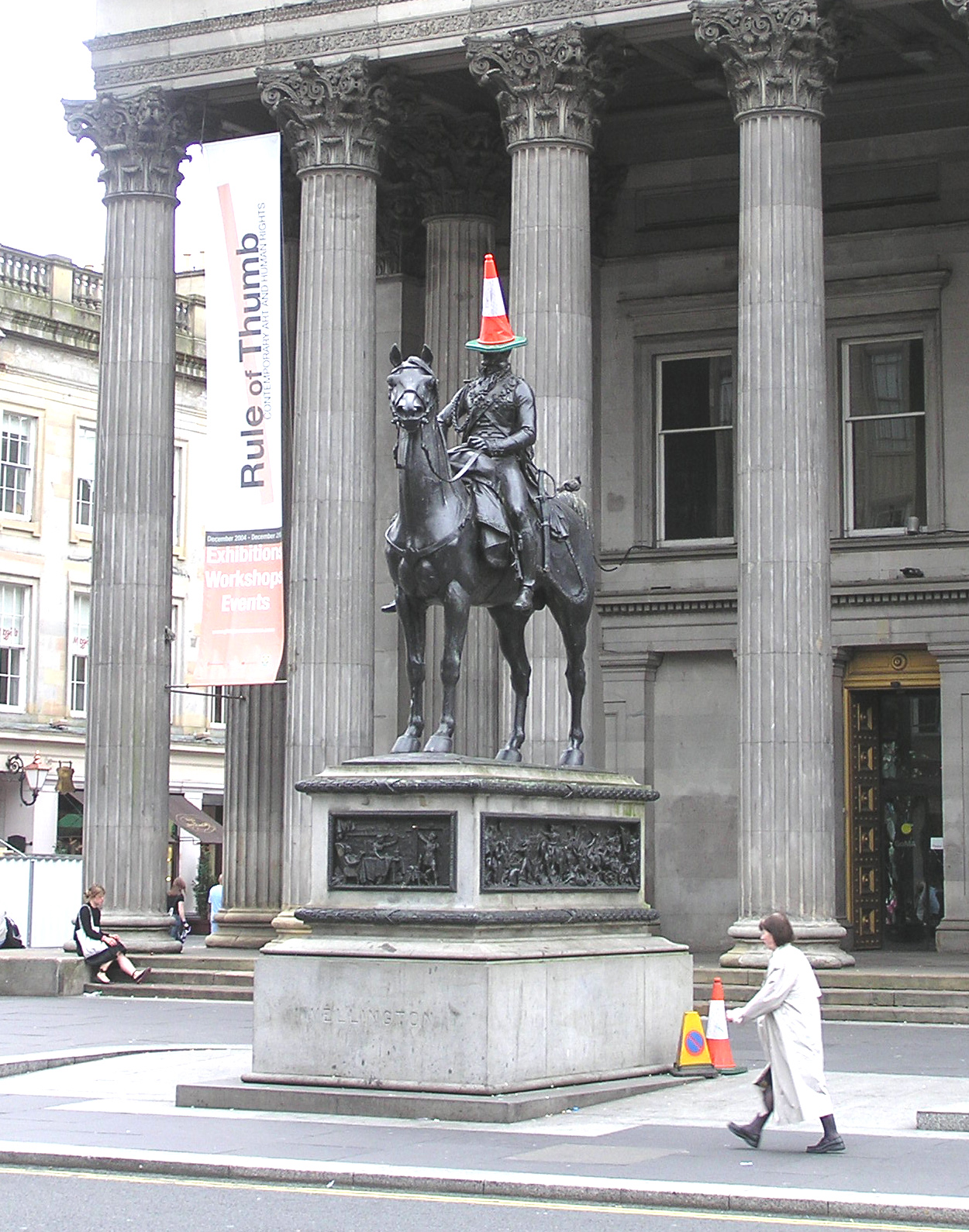
Duke of Wellington statue, with cone (and reserve cones on standby)

In 2007, artist Dennis Oppenheim commemorated the traffic cone with a monumental sculpture of five 20-foot-tall (6.1 m) cones. They were installed temporarily in Miami, Seattle's Olympic Sculpture Park, and Seoul, Korea.

An orange-and-white cone is the logo used by VideoLAN (best known for its VLC media player software).

German group Kraftwerk featured traffic cones on their first two albums, as well as in their concerts at the time.

Traditionally, but unofficially, the Wellington Statue in Glasgow is decorated with a traffic cone. The presence of the cone is given as the reason the statue is in the Lonely Planet 1000 Ultimate Sights guide (at number 229) as a "most bizarre monument".

=== Television ===
The Traffic Cones is a Belgian TV series on Nickelodeon created by Pascal Adant.

== See also ==
- Amsterdammertje
- Bollard (traffic)
- Cones Hotline
- Construction barrel
- Road traffic control
- Traffic barrier
- Traffic guard
- VLC Media Player
