= Customer Service Excellence =

The Customer Service Excellence, (previously the "Charter Mark") is an accreditation for organisations, intended to indicate an independent validation of achievement.

== History ==
The Charter Mark was an award demonstrating the achievement of national standard for excellence in customer service in United Kingdom public sector organisations. Introduced in 1991, it was replaced in 2008 by Customer Service Excellence standard, with the last issued Charter Marks expiring in 2011. The Charter Mark was one of the consequences of a political initiative, the Citizen's Charter, by Prime Minister John Major in 1991, to improve customer service and performance in the public sector.

In 2005, the system was reviewed, and it was recommended the scheme be replaced. Accordingly, the Customer Service Excellence standard was launched, and a phased transfer was initiated. Applications for Charter Marks were officially closed on 30 June 2008, with the official final validity date becoming 30 June 2011.

== Recipients ==
The scope of public sector organisations includes departments of local councils, voluntary organisations having more than 10% public funding, and also private subcontractors on public contracts. It also includes public transport operators and the gas, electricity and water utilities. A number of Park and Ride bus schemes gained Charter Marks, displaying the mark on their buses.

The first Council in the UK to achieve the Corporate Customer Service Excellence award was Fenland District Council, Cambridgeshire.

== See also ==
- Artsmark
- Sportsmark
