= Citizen's Charter =

British political initiative

The Citizen's Charter was a British political initiative launched by the then prime minister, John Major, on 22 July 1991, less than a year into his premiership.

== Aims ==
It aimed to improve public services in the UK by:

- Making administration accountable and more user-focused.
- Ensuring transparency and the right to information in an open and easy to understand manner.
- Taking measures to improve performance in the civil service.
- Adopting a stakeholder approach.

All public services, from hospitals to prison services, local government offices to fire services, would have to publish clear targets for levels of service. NHS patients would have guaranteed time limits for all consultations, and there were individual Charters for schools, housing tenants and motorists. Those bodies that were meeting their defined standards were granted a "Charter Mark".

The charter ensures the following:

1) quality by improving services
2) choices for the user
3) standards specifying what to expect within a time frame
4) value for the taxpayers' money
5) accountability of the service provider
6) transparency in rules and procedures
7) proper code of conduct and grievance redressal mechanism.

Dennis Kavanagh described Major's motivation for this policy as his new perspective on public services. Having rejected privatisation of health and education, he wanted to raise the standing of the services and insisted that consumers should be treated more sensitively.

== Reception ==
=== Overview ===
The initiative was criticised by some for claiming to improve public services while reducing the money available for them, and for introducing private methods of management in the public sector. It was also claimed that the result was a "box-ticking mentality" concentrating on the measurable, rather than on the individual users of services. Many in Major's own government were indifferent about the initiative. Some elements of the Charter idea were also unsuccessful, notably the much-derided "Cones Hotline". However, many have since praised the initiative as improving the culture and transparency of the public sector.

All new applications for Charter Marks were officially closed on 30 June 2008 and the scheme was terminated in 2010, with the officially declared final validity date being 30 June 2011. It was replaced with a similar Customer Service Excellence scheme.

== Sources ==
- BBC "On This Day"
