= Roadworks =

Construction of surfacing/building road with asphalt or concrete

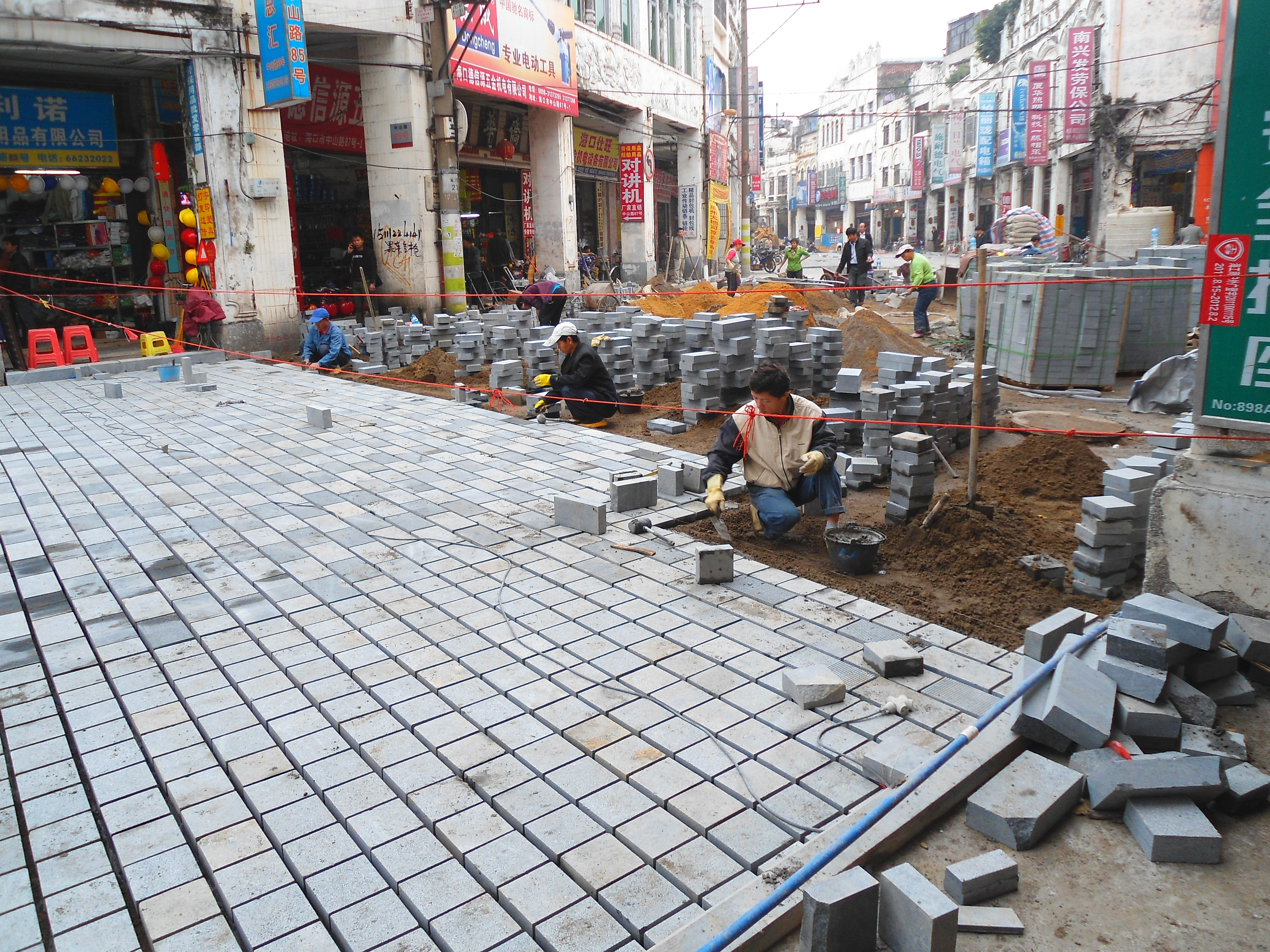
Replacing the old road with concrete pavers in Bo'ao Road area, Haikou City, Hainan, China.

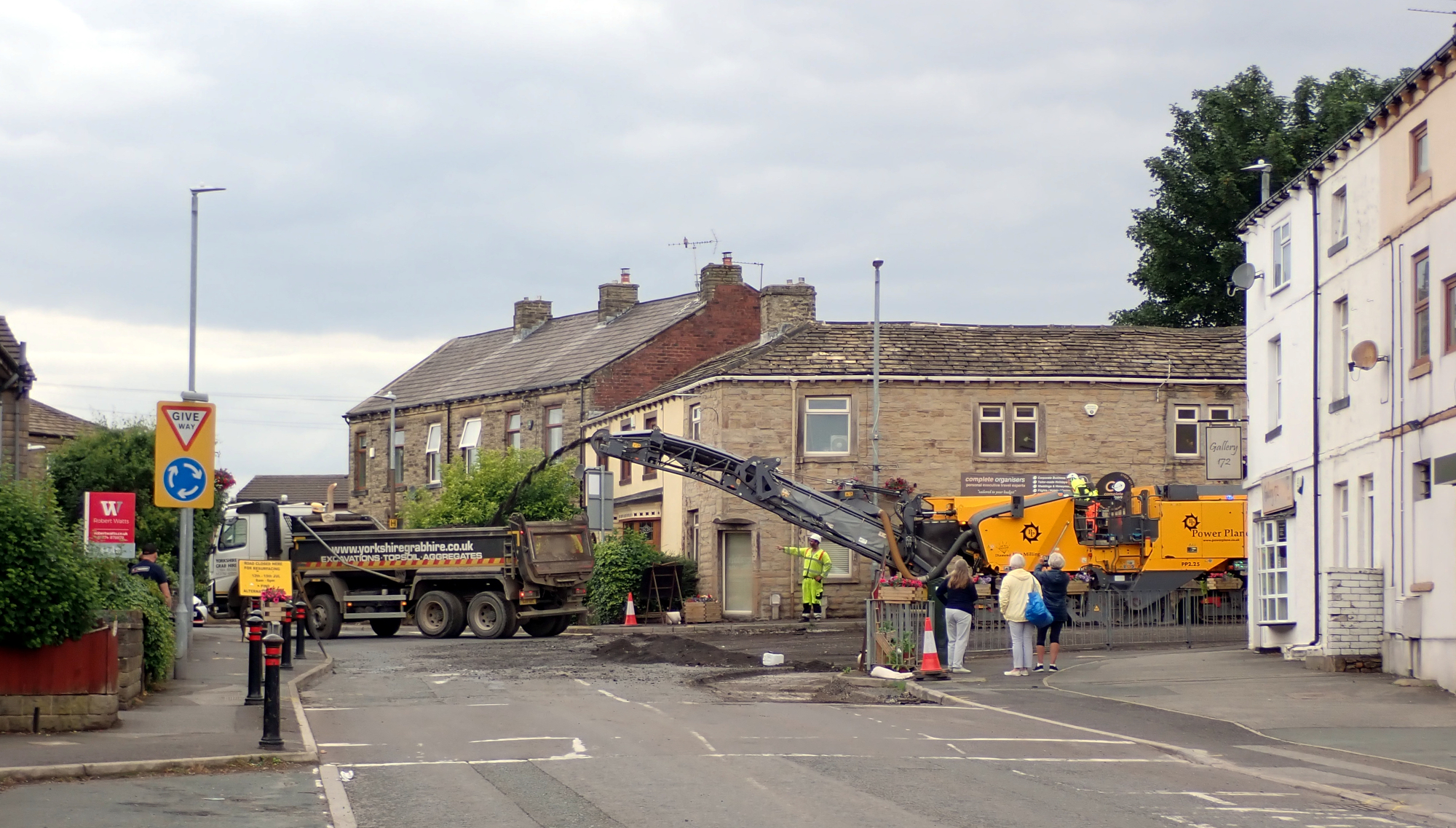
Worn asphalt concrete being removed before laying a new layer in Roberttown, UK

Roadworks, also called road construction or road work, occur when part of a road, or in rare cases, the entire road, has to be occupied for work relating to the road, most often in the case of road surface repairs. In the United States road work could also mean any work conducted in close proximity of travel way (thoroughfare) such as utility work or work on power lines (i.e. telephone poles). The general term of road work is known as work zone.

Roadworks can, however, also happen when a major accident occurs and road debris from the crash needs to be cleared.

Roadworks are often signposted, although signage sometimes comes too close to the work site. Typical road work traffic controls are temporary signs, traffic cones, barrier boards and t-top bollards as well as other forms of warning devices. There are standards of temporary traffic control established in each country for various type of road work.

Ideally, roadworks take place at night, because of low volumes of road traffic, and it helps to avoid any traffic jams if working during the day, and it also secures the safety of both workers and the people around, letting pedestrians and drivers have no issue crossing or driving on the road. Roadworks can cause injures to workers due to unsafe work environments and damage to passing cars. Roadwork mitigation could refer to fixing the old road, fixing potholes, cracks and any bumps that can cause any damage to passing drivers and their vehicles.

Currently there are very few sources of accurate roadworks information sites available that report on the status of current works and future works.

== Signage ==
German roadworks sign. Similar signs are used in other European countries.

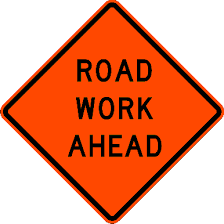
An orange diamond sign for upcoming roadworks. The worded legend shown here is banned by the 1968 Vienna Convention on Road Signs and Signals, but is allowed in the 2009 Manual on Uniform Traffic Control Devices.

The Vienna Convention on Road Signs and Signals (since 1968) prohibits the use of the "MEN WORKING" legend, replacing it with the legend "ROAD WORK" and the symbolic roadworks sign (typically using a gender-neutral silhouette).

An orange diamond sign indicates upcoming roadworks. Typically, roadworks signs are indicated by an orange diamond in most MUTCD-influenced countries. For most European countries, the roadworks sign includes a red-bordered triangular sign with a symbol of roadworks.

== By jurisdiction ==
=== United Kingdom ===
In the United Kingdom, the government roadworks.org website aims to provide a national and live dataset of roadworks for the purpose of coordination and reporting. It includes roadworks information supplied by local authorities and national agencies like the Highways Agency. Local authorities in the UK are permitted to operare "lane rental" schemes, which levy a daily charge payable by companies who undertake road works. Charges can be applied for the full closure of a road or, at a lower rate, for the closure of one or more traffic lane. Lane rental schemes are intended to encourage businesses to speed up their work or to organise it in a less disruptive manner.

=== United States ===
The 1948 edition of the Manual of Uniform Traffic Control Devices specified the legend MEN WORKING to indicate roadworks. The Federal Highway Administration (since 1990) has prohibited the use of the "MEN WORKING" legend.

== See also ==
- Concrete pavement restoration
- IGGA
- Road traffic control
- Roadblock
- Smart work zone
- Maintenance of traffic
