= The Flat Stanley Project =

Educational project

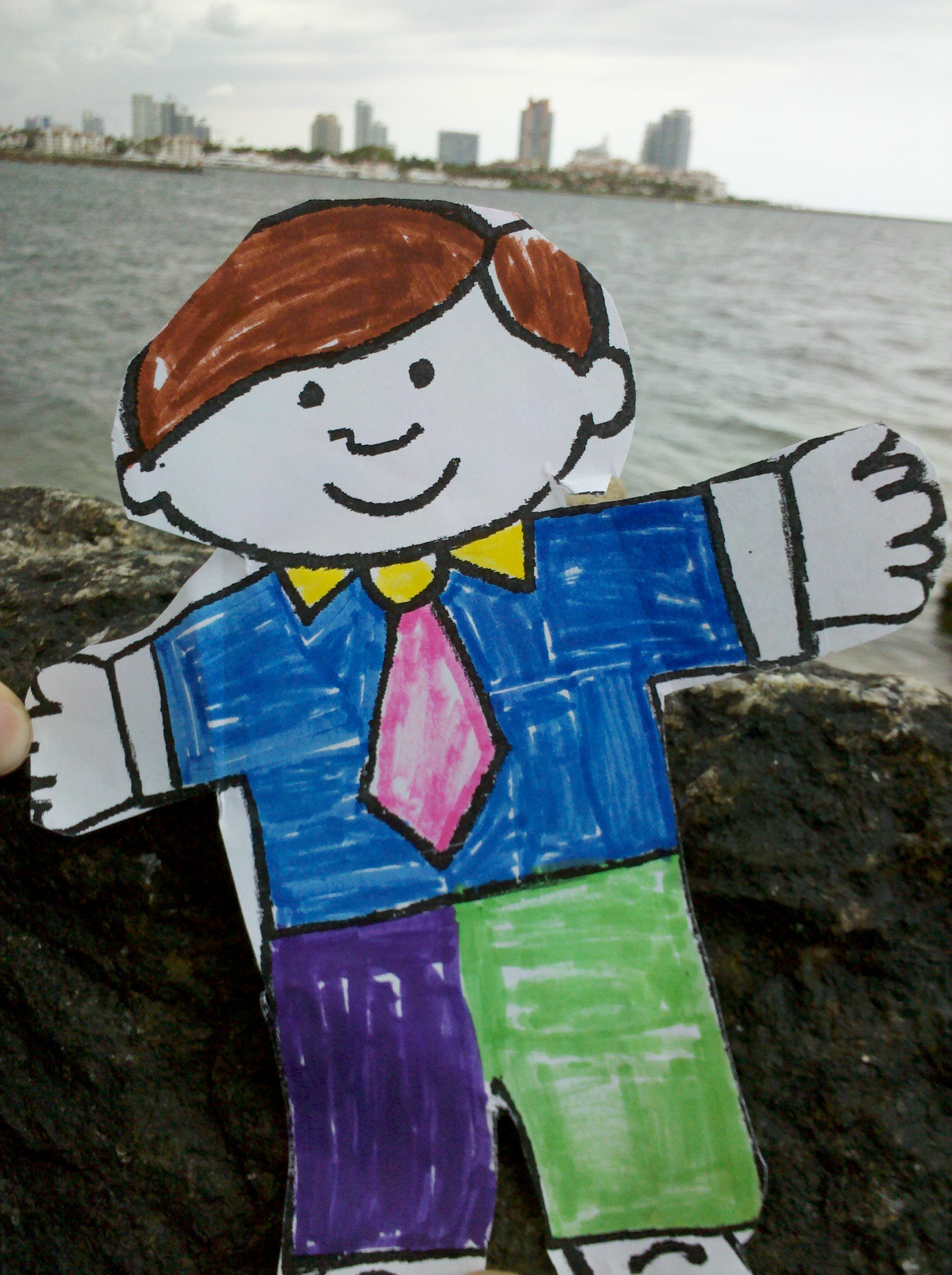
Flat Stanley braving the weather in Miami Beach

The Flat Stanley Project is an educational project that was started in 1995 by Dale Hubert, a third grade schoolteacher in London, Ontario, Canada. The project features paper cut-outs based on the title character of the 1964 children's book Flat Stanley.

The project was designed to facilitate the improvement of the reading and writing skills of elementary school students, while also promoting an interest in learning about different people and places. In 2001, Hubert was presented the Prime Minister's Awards for Teaching Excellence, an annual award issued by the Prime Minister of Canada to honour outstanding and innovative elementary and secondary school teachers.

== History ==
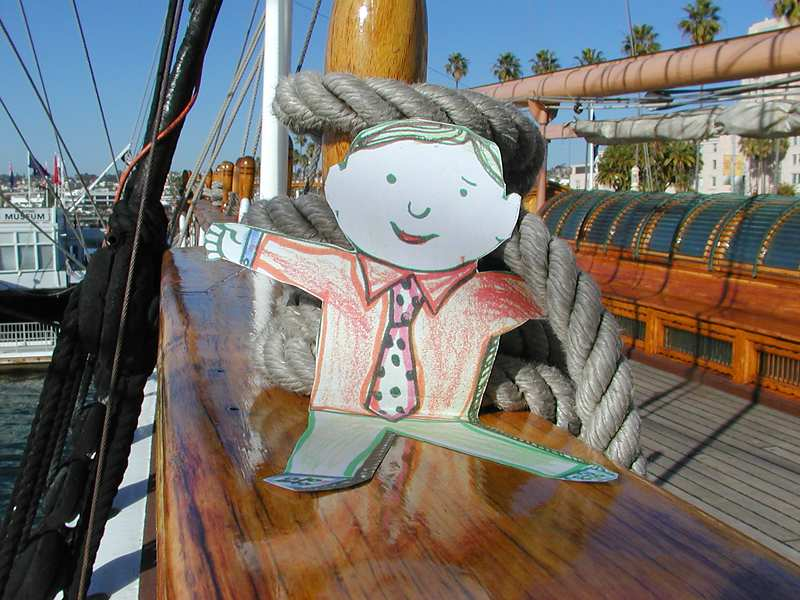
Flat Stanley on a boat as part of the Flat Stanley Project

Dale Hubert first introduced the Flat Stanley Project to his students at Wilfrid Jury Public School in 1995. The project's name comes from the eponymous character of the children's book Flat Stanley. Written in 1964 by American author Jeff Brown, the book centers around the life of character Stanley Lambchop, a boy who is accidentally flattened.

In an interview with CNN in 2005, Hubert explained: "In the book, by Jeff Brown, Stanley gets squashed flat by a falling bulletin board. Stanley's parents rolled him up, put him in an envelope and mailed him to his friend in California. And that just seemed like a way of communicating that grade-three students might enjoy."

Students involved in the Flat Stanley Project read the story of Flat Stanley and are subsequently given black-and-white cut-outs of him for them to color. The students are also asked to write a story about him, including details such as where he is from, his daily routine and his interests, then they mail their Stanley to someone, such as a friend or relative in another country, or a student at another school participating in the program. The person receiving the Flat Stanley is asked to take a picture with the cut-out doll and to send a letter back, either via email or regular mail, to the student recounting Flat Stanley's adventures along with the accompanying photo. The student then shares the photo and letter with their class.

By the end of its first year there were 13 classrooms participating in the project across the province of Ontario. Classrooms in the United States shortly followed suit and, by 2006, the program had grown to 6,000 classes in 47 nations. By 2011, it was reported that at least 88 countries were participating in the program annually.

== In the media ==
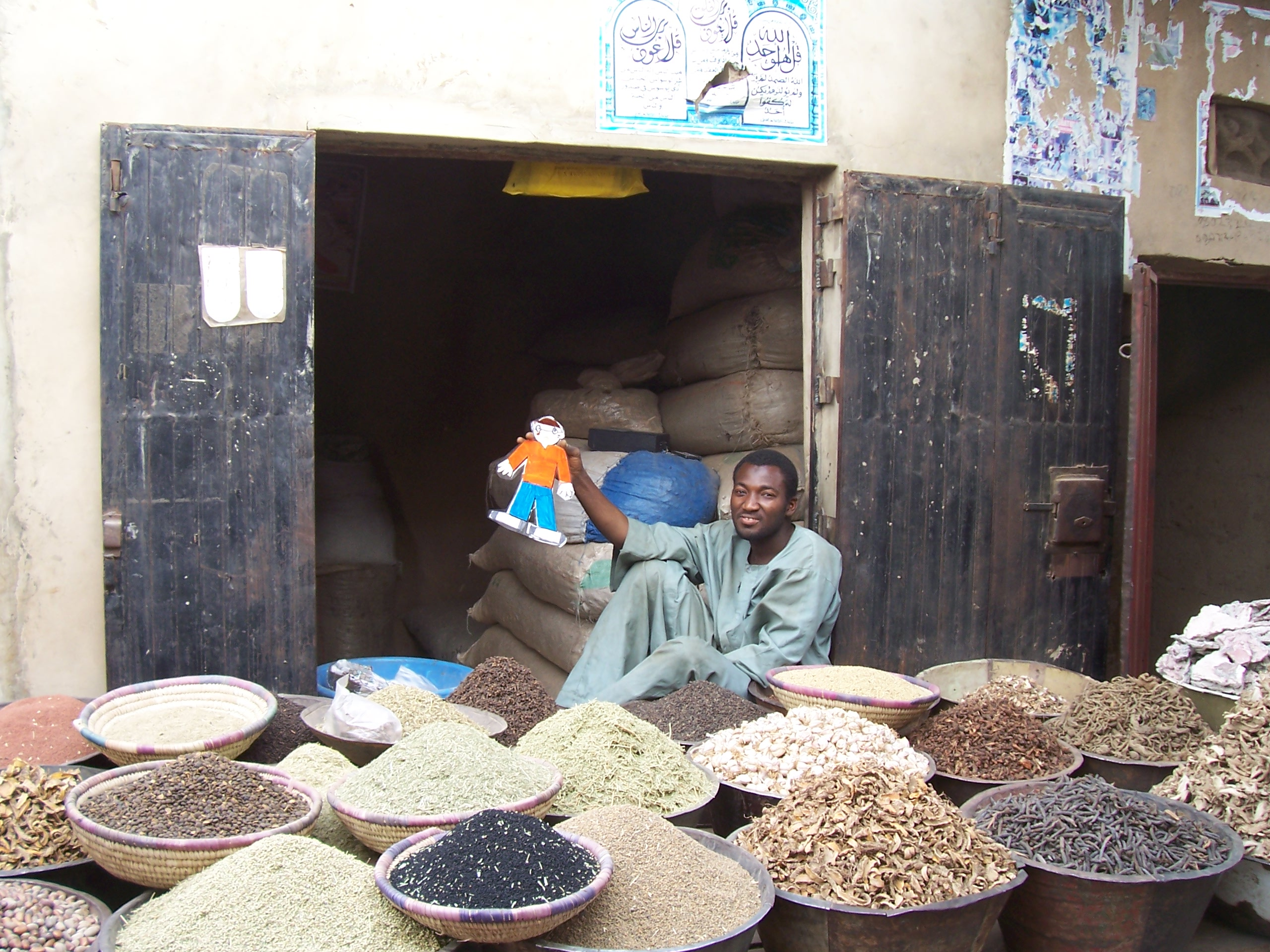
Flat Stanley with a shop owner in Kano, Nigeria

The Flat Stanley Project's popularity increased in the 2000s after it received increased media attention.

Similar to the travelling gnome prank, photos of Flat Stanley began to appear in the news media and on social media sites with the cut-out doll pictured in increasingly exotic and unusual locales and with various celebrities.

In the run-up to the 2003 California gubernatorial recall election, Arnold Schwarzenegger took his son's Flat Stanley with him on the campaign trail, including his appearance that year on The Tonight Show with Jay Leno. Clint Eastwood carried his daughter's Stanley along with him on the red carpet at the Oscars in 2005. US Presidents Barack Obama, George W. Bush and Bill Clinton have all had their pictures taken with him, as well as former US Vice President Dick Cheney.

Flat Stanley travelled on Presidential airliner Air Force One accompanied by then-Secretary of State Colin Powell and also orbited the Earth aboard the Space Shuttle Discovery. According to the February 26, 2009 broadcast of Countdown with Keith Olbermann, Flat Stanley was on board US Airways Flight 1549 when it was forced to make an unpowered emergency water landing in the Hudson River. He was carried to safety in the briefcase of his travelling companion.

Flat Stanley has also been photographed alongside such people as television personalities Steve Irwin, Jamie Oliver and Gordon Ramsay, NASCAR drivers Joe Nemechek and Richard Petty, former heavyweight boxer Muhammad Ali, NFL quarterback Peyton Manning, musicians Clay Aiken and Willie Nelson, as well as Ireland's oldest person.

The Flat Stanley Project was featured in a 2004 episode of the animated TV series King of the Hill titled "How I Learned To Stop Worrying and Love the Alamo", in which Peggy Hill takes photographs of a Flat Stanley doll in order to help teach kids about geography and safety issues. Stanley has also made appearances on the television series The West Wing and Everybody Loves Raymond, as well as game shows Who Wants to Be a Millionaire? and Jeopardy!.

== Flat Stanley goes Hi-Tech ==
In 2006, four schools in rural Chesterfield County, South Carolina implemented a year-long project called Flat Stanley Goes Hi-Tech. Project participants communicated and shared photographs via email and webcam with students attending participating schools in Chile and Nova Scotia, Canada. The project involved 9 teachers and over 200 students.

The progress of the project was captured in an hour-long documentary film that was broadcast on South Carolina Educational Television (SCETV). Links to the video as well links to interviews with the cast and crew are available at the Flat Stanley Goes Hi-tech website.

Flat Stanley Goes Hi-Tech won the TIPS (Technology Innovation Programs in Schools) Award for South Carolina in 2006, presented at South Carolina Ed-Tech, an annual educational technology conference held by The South Carolina Association for Educational Technology (SCAET) in Myrtle Beach, South Carolina.

== Variations ==
The Flat Stanley Project has inspired similar projects worldwide.

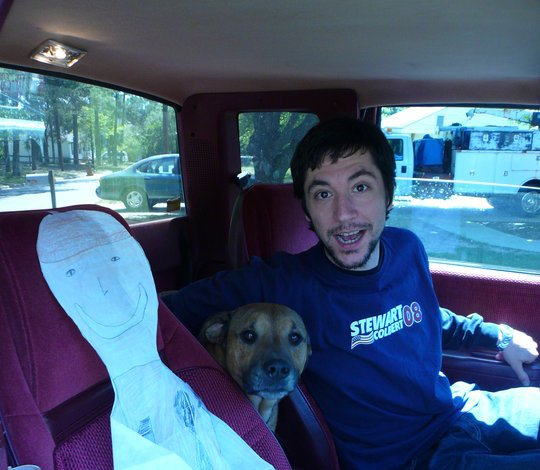
A traced and life-sized variation of "Flat Self", Flat Stanley sent from Ft. Wayne, Indiana, going for a ride in Greensboro, North Carolina

=== Flat Mark ===
In 2003 Karlo Cabrera, a teacher at Fenside Public School in Toronto created "Flat Mark" as part of a civics and literacy project. The idea for Flat Mark came from nine-year-old student Steven Matskoulis, who had visited the Parliament Buildings with his parents and had suggested it to Cabrera after having read the children's book Flat Stanley.

Cabrera's fourth grade class sent Flat Mark to the newly elected Canadian Prime Minister Paul Martin along with a letter that asked that he take Flat Mark along with him on the job. Flat Mark attended several transition meetings, met with Mr. Martin's Chief of Staff Tim Murphy and principal secretary Francis Fox, toured Rideau Hall and attended a meeting between Martin and the Governor General of Canada Adrienne Clarkson.

=== Flat Stan the Man ===
In 2010, the St. Louis Cardinals launched the "Stand for Stan" campaign with the goal of convincing President Barack Obama to present the Presidential Medal of Freedom to the Major League Baseball Hall-of-Famer Stan "The Man" Musial. Fans were also encouraged to download copies of "Flat Stan the Man" from the club's website and to post pictures of themselves with their cut-out to the club's website.

The cause was moved forward by Senators Christopher Bond, Republican of Missouri; Claire McCaskill, Democrat of Missouri; and Richard J. Durbin, Democrat of Illinois, who maintained contact with the White House. On November 17, 2010, it was announced that Musial was to receive the award along with 14 others. Musial was presented his award in a ceremony at the White House on February 15, 2011.

=== Flat Stanley Cup ===
After the Chicago Blackhawks' Stanley Cup victories in 2010, 2013 and 2015, the Chicago Tribune newspaper offered a cut-out "Flat Stanley Cup" for fans to download. Blackhawks fans were encouraged to then post pictures of themselves and the cup on Twitter with the hashtag #flatstanleycup or they could post them to the Tribune's site.

=== Flat Francis ===
The Catholic Extension—an organization based in Chicago that raises money for dioceses in need across the United States—created the "Flat Francis" campaign to officially welcome Pope Francis on his visit to the United States in 2015.

The organization created the website flatfrancis.org where participants could download a copy of Flat Francis. Participants were asked to take pictures of themselves with their Flat Francis and post them to social media sites along with the hashtag #FlatFrancis.

=== Flat Selves ===
Some schools have their students create a "Flat Self" usually designed to resemble the appearance of the student creating the cut-out and using the student's own name (for example, a student named Leslie would create a "Flat Leslie"). Variations of Flat Selves also include life-sized versions that are created by tracing the students' own bodies.

=== Flat Stanley Kubrick ===
In 2022, the podcast Blank Check with Griffin & David started a new miniseries on the films of Stanley Kubrick. The podcast released a template for a Flat Stanley Kubrick so listeners of the podcast could take pictures of Flat Stanley Kubrick in different locations.

== See also ==
- Flat Stanley
- Pen pal
