= Moon Man (2012 film) =

2012 animated feature film directed by Stephan Schesch

- Film poster
- Directed by: Stephan Schesch
- Screenplay by: Stephan Schesch; Ralph Martin
- Based on: Moon Man by Tomi Ungerer
- Narrated by: Tomi Ungerer
- Edited by: Sarah Clara Weber; Laurent Lepaumier
- Production companies: Schesch Filmkreation production Le Pacte; Cartoon Saloon
- Release dates: 8 June 2012 (Annecy); 14 March 2013 (Germany)
- Running time: 95 minutes
- Countries: Germany; France; Ireland
- Languages: German; French; English
- Box office: $131,705

Moon Man (German: Der Mondmann) is a 2012 animated fantasy film directed by Stephan Schesch based on the 1966 novel of the same name by Tomi Ungerer.

== Premise ==
The man on the moon gets bored and visits Earth, but his arrival is construed as an alien invasion by the Earth’s president. However, the children of Earth cannot sleep without seeing the Moon Man in the sky, leading to him getting help from a scientist to return home. This scientist built a rocket for the president to use against the Moon Man, but after he learns of his intentions to return home, he repurposes it.

== Cast ==
- Moon Man: Isabelle Leprince
- Narrator: Tomi Ungerer
- President: Michel Dodane
- Ekla: Jean-Yves Chatelais
- Conquistadora: Frédérique Tirmont
- Father: Pierre-François Pistorio
- Little Girl: Lou Dubernat

== Release ==
The film had its world premiere at the Annecy International Animation Film Festival in France on 8 June 2012, and its German premiere on 28 June 2012 at the Five Lakes Film Festival in Fünfseenland. The film had its theatrical release in Germany on 14 March 2013. It had a worldwide gross of $131,705.

== Production ==
=== Production notes and release ===
The film was produced by Schesch Filmkreation GmbH & Co. KG (Munich/Berlin) and co-produced by Le Pacte (Paris) and Cartoon Saloon (Kilkenny). Financial support was provided by the FilmFernsehFonds Bayern (Munich), the Franco-German Funding Commission, Eurimages, the Filmförderungsanstalt (FFA) (Berlin), the Federal Government Commissioner for Culture and the Media film fund (Berlin), the German Federal Film Fund (DFFF) (Berlin), the Kuratorium junger deutscher Film foundation (Wiesbaden), Medienboard Berlin-Brandenburg GmbH (Potsdam), the Irish Film Board (Dublin), the Centre national du cinéma et de l'image animée (Paris), and the European Union's MEDIA Programme (Brussels). The production had an estimated budget of €10 million.

Producer Stephan Schesch had previously overseen the adaptation of Tomi Ungerer's story The Three Robbers, which was released in 2007. Katharina Thalbach provided the voice of the evil aunt in that film.

The film had its world premiere on 8 June 2012 at the Annecy International Animation Film Festival in Annecy, France, and its German premiere on 28 June 2012 at the Fünf Seen Film Festival in the Fünfseenland region southwest of Munich. It was released theatrically in France on 19 December 2012 and in Germany on 14 March 2013.

The film was also screened at numerous festivals:

- 6 July 2012 – Festival International du Film de La Rochelle, France
- 2 September 2012 – Reykjavik International Film Festival (RIFF), Iceland
- 19 October 2012 – Warsaw International Film Festival, Poland
- 18 November 2012 – Arras Film Festival, France
- 20 January 2013 – Göteborgs Lilla Filmfestival, Sweden
- 27 January 2013 – Göteborg Film Festival, Sweden
- 28 February 2013 – Luxembourg City Film Festival, Luxembourg
- 12 March 2013 – BUFF International Film Festival, Sweden
- 13 April 2013 – Buenos Aires International Festival of Independent Cinema, Argentina
- 23 May 2013 – Seattle International Film Festival, United States
- 14 October 2013 – Kids Fest, Serbia
- 18 October 2013 – Santa Fe Independent Film Festival, United States
- 9 October 2014 – Haifa International Film Festival, Israel
- 15 November 2014 – El Meu Primer Festival, Barcelona, Spain
- 13 September 2015 – Duhok International Film Festival, Kurdistan Region, Iraq

The film was also released in the Netherlands in March 2013, Belgium in October 2013, Ireland and the United Kingdom in December 2013, as well as in Brazil, Hungary, and Slovenia. Its international title is Moon Man.

On 20 September 2014, Indigo released the film on DVD and Blu-ray.

=== Music ===
The film features the song Moon River, performed by Louis Armstrong, as well as the German folk song Der Mond ist aufgegangen ("The Moon Has Risen"). Several scenes are also accompanied by ambient jazz compositions by Jun Miyake and the rock song In-A-Gadda-Da-Vida by Iron Butterfly.

== Reception ==
=== Critical response ===
In awarding the film its "Especially Valuable" rating, the German Film and Media Review (FBW) described it as "a charming and otherworldly animated delight for the whole family". The jury particularly praised the harmonious yet contrasting designs of the characters and settings, the integration of different narrative and artistic elements, and the voice performances by Katharina Thalbach, Ulrich Tukur, and Ulrich Noethen, as well as Tomi Ungerer's own contribution as narrator.

Writing for Zeit Online, Birgit Roschy noted that the film's "slightly somnambulistic atmosphere" transported viewers into a nocturnal nirvana. She praised the hand-drawn 2D animation, which closely followed Ungerer's original illustrations while employing a softer visual style. Roschy also commended the soundtrack, describing it as "magnificent and unconventional", ranging from ambient jazz and the folk song Der Mond ist aufgegangen to Louis Armstrong's wistful Moon River and Iron Butterfly's driving In-A-Gadda-Da-Vida. She was critical, however, of Katharina Thalbach's vocal performance, arguing that her distinctive raspy voice did not suit such an ethereal character as the Moon Man. Roschy also felt that extending the source material to feature-film length introduced narrative weaknesses.

Reviewing the film for kino-zeit.de, Sophie Charlotte Rieger remarked that at first glance Moon Man hardly seemed like a children's film due to its dark colour palette and somewhat abstract character designs. Nevertheless, she argued that it ultimately functioned as a children's film with a clear message about the value of friendship. Rieger praised the fairy-tale quality created by the story's indeterminate setting and time period, as well as the performances of the voice cast. In contrast to Roschy, she considered Katharina Thalbach's voice work particularly effective, lending the Moon Man both credibility and humour.

Alexandra Seitz, writing for Kinofenster, selected the film as "Film of the Month" and observed that it concerned not only the physical journeys of its characters but also their inner transformations. She described the sequences featuring the Moon Man as colourful, magical, lyrical, and gentle. Seitz compared aspects of the film's visual style to the paintings of Henri Rousseau, the dreamlike world of the Italian Pittura Metafisica movement, and the inventions of Leonardo da Vinci. In contrast, the President's world was characterised as angular, harsh, and dominated by monochromatic black, red, and blue tones. Seitz concluded that these artistic references demonstrated the enduring cultural significance of the Moon, reminding adults of its enchantment while opening a realm of wonder to children.

Petra Wille of Filmstarts described Moon Man as a colourful animated film that adapted Tomi Ungerer's book in a poetic and touching manner. She praised the casting of the voice actors, particularly Katharina Thalbach, as well as the effective use of music. In her conclusion, Wille wrote that the film's atmosphere, visual style, and voice performances combined to create a poetic adventure that remained faithful to its literary source.

Kino.de likewise praised the film, stating that Tomi Ungerer's creative vision had found the ideal interpreter in Stephan Schesch. The review argued that beneath its childlike surface, the film offered a philosophical reflection on life, friendship, and trust. It also highlighted the soundtrack and the performances of the voice cast, especially Katharina Thalbach, whose portrayal was said to give the Moon Man depth and personality. The reviewer concluded that the film was an intelligent, unconventional, and playful work that appealed to audiences of nearly all ages.

The Lexicon of International Films described Ungerer's picture-book classic as a lovingly animated fable about a kind-hearted yet naïve Moon Man who leaves his celestial home out of boredom and becomes the pawn of a power-hungry president on Earth. The review identified the growing friendship between the Moon Man and an elderly inventor as the film's emotional centre and praised its sound design and music. It also noted that a parallel storyline involving a young girl travelling through the summer night with her father contributed to the film's poetic, dreamlike atmosphere. On review aggregator Rotten Tomatoes, the film holds an approval rating of 86% based on 22 critical reviews. The critics consensus reads: "Its deliberate pacing is certainly an acquired taste, but Moon Man's enchanting animation style and subversive flourishes make it a refreshingly off-beat yarn."
