= Flat Daddy =

A Flat Daddy (also Flat Mommy or Flat Soldier) is a life-sized cardboard cut-out of someone absent from home, the idea being to keep connected to family members during a deployment. Flat Daddies came in fashion after the start of the Iraq War when spouses and children were left alone after soldiers were called up for duty. By the mid-2000s (decade), thousands of Flat Daddies have been produced for families in the USA.

The Flat Daddy concept dates back to at least 2003, when Cindy Sorenson of Bismarck, North Dakota created a cutout of her husband who was deployed in Iraq with the North Dakota National Guard. The name was modeled on the 1964 children's book Flat Stanley and a program in which children mailed small cutouts of themselves. The idea was shared by Sorenson with Elaine Dumler, a motivational speaker who mentioned the idea in a book offering coping tips for families with a deploying soldier. Dumler obtained a trademark on the term "Flat Daddy", hoping to prevent anyone from profiting on the idea. Dumler filed for the trademark on October 16, 2006, for use as photographs of active duty military personnel mounted on cardboard cut-outs, vinyl, and photo paper and in books in the field of military family readiness. The trademark application indicated that the term was first used in September 2003.

As of 2006, the Maine National Guard had produced 200 "Flat Daddy" and "Flat Mommy" cutouts for the families of soldiers deployed in Iraq and Afghanistan. The Maine program was started based on information received at a National Guard conference. The state's family-support director noted the enthusiastic response to the program, stating that "If there's something we can do to make it a little easier on the families, then that's our job and our responsibility. It brings them a little bit closer and might help them somewhere down the line."

By 2007, a Toledo, Ohio firm had manufactured over 1,000 of the cutout figures. While many of the initial Flat Daddies had been produced gratis, the firm was seeking sponsors for the 50 per week that it was producing.
