= Where Is My Gnome? =

Viral marketing advertising

Where is my Gnome? was a viral marketing campaign by Travelocity in early 2004, created by creative agency McKinney. Its mascot, a two-foot tall bearded gnome wearing a blue coat, black boots and a red conical hat, is known as "the Roaming Gnome".

== Overview ==
The advertisements consisted of a man named Bill looking for his garden gnome. On January 3, the Boston Herald and the Boston Globe had these advertisements in their publication. The advertisements were inspired by the travelling gnome prank. Since the initiation of the advertising campaign, the Roaming Gnome has become the de facto mascot of Travelocity. In 2005 the campaign won a Gold Effie Award for marketing. In order to leverage the then new social media trend, Travelocity created an official page for the Roaming Gnome on MySpace in 2007 and later on Chatroulette, Twitter and Instagram.

After TV advertisements voiced by Harry Enfield were screened nationally on United States networks, and on a Web site whereismygnome.com, many readers considered it to be a prank of the Garden Gnome Liberation Front.

As the series progressed, new commercials were aired with updated tag lines: You’ll Never Roam Alone, Go and Smell the Roses and Wander Wisely. For the Wander Wisely campaign, Travelocity hired a new advertising agency, Campbell-Ewald, to feature the company as a trusted travel source. The gnome remains in the commercials; however, he is no longer held against his will, but now works as "The Roaming Gnome: Denouncer of Travel Myths." In these commercials he discusses two myths, one where the gnome states that Travelocity's services are able to denounce the myth, and the other where the gnome ends up causing a mess. In one such commercial, he visits the Bermuda Triangle to see if things really do disappear there, denouncing the myth even as objects disappear behind him until he also vanishes mid-sentence.

In 2006, a major promotion involved 20 Travelocity gnomes carefully hidden throughout the 4.5-acre (1.8 ha) atrium of Gaylord Palms Resort & Convention Center in Kissimmee, Florida. During the resort's Best of Florida Christmas promotion, guests were encouraged to find the gnomes to win a cruise to Alaska.

The Amazing Race has featured the Roaming Gnome on a leg in multiple seasons where teams are required to pick and carry the Roaming Gnome around while they complete the episode's tasks and then bring the Roaming Gnome to the Pit Stop. The Roaming Gnome will usually contain the next clue at the bottom of its base.

== Inspiration ==
The concept of the Roaming Gnome and his international escapades dates back to the Travelling gnome prank that began in the 1980s, later reflected in the 2001 French film Amélie. In the film, Amelie's father finds that his lawn gnome has gone missing. In the mail, he receives pictures of the gnome in exotic landmark locations.

== Credits ==
The original campaign was invented by Lisa Shimotakahara and Philip Marchington of McKinney & Silver, an advertising agency in Durham, North Carolina. The tagline, "You'll never roam alone", was written by John Guynn, a copywriter at the same agency. Avant Garde Studio, with lead artists, Amy Medford and Leonid Siveriver, worked with Philip Marchington to design and create the unique look of the Roaming Gnome. Avant Garde Studio is also responsible for sculpting and painting the original 3D sculpture prototypes.
