= Otto: The Autobiography of a Teddy Bear =

1999 children's book by Tomi Ungerer

- English-language edition cover
- Author: Tomi Ungerer
- Language: German
- Publication date: January 1, 1999

Otto: The Autobiography of a Teddy Bear is a 1999 children's book written and illustrated by Tomi Ungerer, originally published in German. The book discusses the Holocaust and its aftermath in a profound manner as witnessed by the teddy bear.
