= Far Out Isn't Far Enough: The Tomi Ungerer Story =

- Official Poster
- Directed by: Brad Bernstein
- Written by: Brad Bernstein
- Produced by: Brad Bernstein, Rick Cikowski
- Starring: Tomi Ungerer, Maurice Sendak, Jules Feiffer, Steven Heller, Michael Patrick Hearn
- Cinematography: Jimmy O'Donnell
- Edited by: Rick Cikowski, Brandon Dumlao, Jason Schmidt
- Music by: Ben Sollee, Eoin Coughlan & Daragh Dukes
- Production company: Corner of the Cave Media
- Distributed by: First Run Features
- Release dates: July 5, 2012 (La Rochelle Film Festival); December 19, 2012 (France)
- Running time: 98 minutes
- Country: United States
- Language: English

Far Out Isn't Far Enough: The Tomi Ungerer Story (French: L'esprit Frappeur) is a 2012 documentary film by American director Brad Bernstein. The documentary details the life and times of renegade children's book author and illustrator Tomi Ungerer. Far Out had its North American premiere at the 2012 Toronto International Film Festival.

== Synopsis ==
Far Out Isn’t Far Enough tracks the expansive life and prolific career of the subversive Alsatian artist Tomi Ungerer. Coming of age under the German occupation of France in World War II, Ungerer went on to produce some of the most iconic imagery in a multitude of artistic genres in mid-20th century America. Yet the same factors that vaulted him to meteoric success - fearless creativity, absolute outspokenness, fierce independence - also made him a lightning rod for controversy and the object of intense malice.

== Production ==
Far Out took four years to complete and was shot in Strasbourg, France, West Cork, Ireland, New York, NY, Amherst, MA and Lockeport, Nova Scotia between 2008 and 2012.

== Interviews ==
The film incorporates over 40 hours of interviews with Mr. Ungerer and has the distinction of being one of Maurice Sendak's final interviews before his death. Other notable interviewees include Pulitzer Prize-winning cartoonist Jules Feiffer, New York Times Book Review critic Steven Heller, children's literature expert Michael Patrick Hearn and the former Irish Fine Gael politician P. J. Sheehan.

== Accolades ==
Far Out was nominated for a 2014 Outstanding Achievement in Graphic Design or Animation by Cinema Eye Honors and was one of only five films nominated for a Documentary Motion Picture at the 2014 Producers Guild Awards. Far Out won Best Documentary at the 2013 Jameson Dublin International Film Festival, won Best Documentary and the Documentary Audience Choice Award at the 2013 Durban International Film Festival in South Africa, won the Documentary competition at the 2013 Nashville Film Festival, won the Audience Award for Best Documentary Feature at the 2013 Florida Film Festival, won the Audience Award for Documentary Features at the 2012 Warsaw International Film Festival and received Honorable Mention for the John Schlesinger Award at the 2013 Palm Springs International Film Festival, which is presented to a first-time documentary filmmaker.
