= Moon Man (novel) =

Novel by Tomi Ungerer

Moon Man (Jean de Lune, in French) is a novel written and illustrated by French author Tomi Ungerer published in 1966. The book won the Book Week prize for children aged 4-8 when it was first released, and is considered a satire by Ungerer himself.

== Plot ==
The Man in the Moon (who is literally a man in the Moon), wishes to join the humans of Planet Earth dancing in parties, because he thinks life is boring. One night, as a comet flies by, the Moon Man jumps out of the Moon, catching the comet's tail, bringing him down to Earth, frightening forest animals. The crash brings hundreds of people from a nearby town to the site. The Moon Man ends up getting thrown in prison because the people mistake him for an invader, instead of a friendly visitor, and even gets shackled with a ball and chain. Nights later, he enters the third quarter of the phase of the moon, shrinking to a small size and so can escape, via the window. When the general comes to inspect, he finds that the Moon Man's prison cell is empty.

Two weeks later, the Moon Man grows back to his full size, wandering while discovering the plants and animals, he comes upon a garden party, with people in gorgeous costumes dancing. A grumpy killjoy complains about the music to the police, and, scared by the police officers' equipment and uniforms, the Moon Man dashes in the forest, beginning a wild chase. Swiftly outracing the police, he comes upon a hidden castle, where he finds scientist Bunsen van der Dunkel, who shows him his experiment he had been perfecting for years: a spaceship, which the Moon Man can use to go back home. Bunsen takes the Moon Man to the rocket ship and waits for him to shrink again into his third phase. A few nights later, the Moon Man squeezes into the rocket, bids Bunsen a tearful farewell, and blasts off back to the Moon. He realizes that the humans of Earth are not as welcoming as he thought they’d be, as he can never live peacefully on the planet and he stays nestled up in the sky, inside the silvery moon, and never returns to Earth.

== Film adaptations ==
=== 1981 film ===
In 1981, the novel was made into the first of two animated films by Weston Woods Studios and Krátký Film Praha, with narration by Peter Hawkins and music by Karel Velebný. It was directed by Gene Deitch. An audiobook version was also released.

=== 2012 film ===
In 2012 the book was adapted again by Stephan Schesch and Sarah Clara Weber as a French-German-Irish coproduction. This version featured a heavily expanded plot, in which the Moon Man is hunted by the President of Earth (voiced by Michel Dodane). Ungerer acted as the narrator, with Isabelle Leprince as Moon Man.
