= The Hat (book) =

1970 children's book by Tomi Ungerer

Cover of the first edition of the book.

The Hat is a children's book written and illustrated by French artist and author Tomi Ungerer. Published in 1970 by Parents' Magazine Press, the book tells the story of a poor veteran, Benito Badoglio, who becomes rich after he unwittingly gains possession of a magic flying top hat. The book is richly illustrated and the text contains numerous vivid and mellifluous descriptions and dialog. For example, upon meeting the top hat, the protagonist cries, "Thunder of Sebastopole!"; in another scene, he shouts, "A thousand Potemkins!" Other characters in the book are "cutthroats", "brigands", a "fainting contessa", and a "dashing cadet". The author's interest in such colorful prose was explained by Selma G. Lanes in the Atlantic Monthly: "Ungerer feels strongly that children enjoy unfamiliar words and euphonious, mystifying phrases." The setting for The Hat is nineteenth century Italy, and was described by Sydney D. Long in the Horn Book Magazine as "a never-never land ..., the comic-opera pictures of The Hat are full of mandolin-playing musicians, splashing fountains, and apple-cheeked peasant lasses."

The book ends much as it begins, with the migration of the top hat from one prosperous owner to one of more dire circumstances. This cyclic plot device suggests the magic top hat has led previous owners to similar changes of fate, and may continue to do so into the future. The book was published by French publisher L'école des loisirs in 1971 under a title of slightly different meaning: Le Chapeau Volant (The Flying Hat). The book was made into a film by Weston Woods in 1982. It was adapted, designed, and directed by Gene Deitch, with narration by Peter Hawkins.

== Synopsis ==
The story begins with a magic satin shiny, black top hat belted with a magenta silk ribbon and sash, flying through the air. It has recently blown from the head of a wealthy man seated in a speeding open carriage. His wife beside him advises him not to mind that the top hat has blown away; though, it is clear from the man's expression that losing his hat greatly concerns him. Before long, the top hat alights upon the head of Benito Badoglio, a poor and disabled veteran. Soon thereafter, Badoglio is witness to a series of potentially disastrous events. He quickly realizes that the top hat can perform heroic deeds on command: it catches a flowerpot falling toward the head of a pedestrian; it returns the only purple puffbird in captivity who has escaped, to the National Zoo; it helps an army unit destroy a hideout of a group of bandits; and it rescues a baby, captive within a burning carriage, as it careens down a long flight of stairs. For some of these acts Benito is rewarded with money, and he soon becomes a rich man. After rescuing her from a runaway carriage with his magic top hat, Badoglio wins the heart of a noblewoman and the couple soon marry. But on the night of their wedding, as the bride and groom speed toward their honeymoon in Sardinia in a convertible, the top hat flies away from Badoglio's head. "Never mind the hat", says his bride, and the top hat continues to fly away into the night.

== Characters ==
The characters in the book are:

- Benito Badoglio: The protagonist of the story who has possession of the top hat.
- A wealthy tourist: The first person Badoglio helps with his magic top hat. He fills Badoglio's top hat with "banknotes and other valuables".
- The Director of the National Zoo: He rewards Badoglio with "one thousand millicentos" for capturing Esmeralda the purple puffbird.
- Capitano Mallamorte: Leader of a military unit who was waiting to destroy the hideout of a "band of cutthroats".
- A dashing cadet: He entertains a young mother and sets the baby carriage on fire after shaking some ashes from his cigar
- Contessa Aspi d'Istra: The Archduke's sister-in-law who is saved by Badoglio's magical top hat and later marries Badoglio.
- The Archduke: He appoints Benito to the role of "Minister of National Emergencies".
