= Terry Major-Ball =

British journalist (1932–2007)

- Born: 2 July 1932; Worcester Park, Surrey, England
- Died: 13 March 2007 (aged 74); Chard, Somerset, England
- Occupations: Banker, businessman, columnist, and media personality
- Years active: 1952–2003
- Spouse: Shirley Wilson (m. 1960)
- Children: 2
- Parents: Tom Major-Ball (father); Gwen Major-Ball (mother)
- Relatives: John Major (brother)
- Military career
- Allegiance: United Kingdom
- Branch: British Army
- Units: Royal Army Medical Corps

Terry Major-Ball (2 July 1932 – 13 March 2007) was a British columnist, banker and media personality who was the elder brother of the former British prime minister John Major. During his brother's six-year premiership, he had a brief career as a television and radio personality and newspaper columnist. Despite the media attention, he always remained loyal and discreet.

== Early life ==
Terry Major-Ball was born in 1932, and grew up in Worcester Park, Surrey. His father, Tom Major-Ball (real name Abraham Thomas Ball), was a music hall performer and circus artiste under the name Tom Major, and combined the two surnames when he started a garden ornament business. His mother, Gwen, Tom's second wife, was a dancer. Unlike his elder sister Pat and younger brother John, Major-Ball failed his 11 plus exam and went to Stoneleigh East Secondary Modern School. During the Second World War, they were evacuated to Norfolk. After World War II, Major-Ball did National Service with the Royal Army Medical Corps in Germany.

After being demobilised, Major-Ball tried, without success, to save his ailing father's business, Major's Garden Ornaments, which was finally taken over by a competitor in 1962. The family's reduced circumstances forced them to move into rented rooms in Coldharbour Lane in Brixton. To supplement the family's income, Terry Major-Ball took many menial jobs. While working at Woolworths in Brixton in 1958, he met Shirley Wilson, whom he married in 1960. Major-Ball later became a meter installer for South Eastern Electricity Board and a banker.

== Brother's premiership ==
Terry Major-Ball first came to the spotlight in November 1990, when his brother John became Prime Minister after the Conservative leadership election. During Major's premiership his brother became a media favourite. In 1994 he published his autobiography Major Major: Memories of an Older Brother, which was ghost-written by the journalist James Hughes-Onslow. It received good reviews and Major-Ball became a regular at book launches. It was praised as "one of the great comic books of the year" by John Wells and "exquisitely funny" by Auberon Waugh. He always remained loyal to his brother and, amongst other things, kept secret his knowledge of the affair between Major and Edwina Currie and the details of a secret half-brother. In 1995 he appeared on Have I Got News for You and The Mrs Merton Show.

In 1993, after noting that he had only been abroad once, to Germany while on National Service, and had never stayed in a hotel, The Evening Standard arranged for him to fly first-class to New York City, where he met Liza Minnelli. Terry Major-Ball later went to Christchurch, New Zealand, to open a garden gnome festival. He had columns in The Daily Express, The Daily Mail and The Guardian. Major-Ball also made a BBC2 travel programme called A Postcard to my Brother, where he visited France, Germany and Poland.

== Later years ==
Following John's departure from office after the 1997 general election, Terry Major-Ball's fame dwindled. In 2003, he moved to Somerset from Croydon, London, where he spent the remaining years of his life until his death from prostate cancer on 13 March 2007 in a hospice in Chard, Somerset. His death was announced on 20 April 2007. He was survived by his wife and children.
