= Tomi Ungerer Museum =

Museum in Strasbourg, France

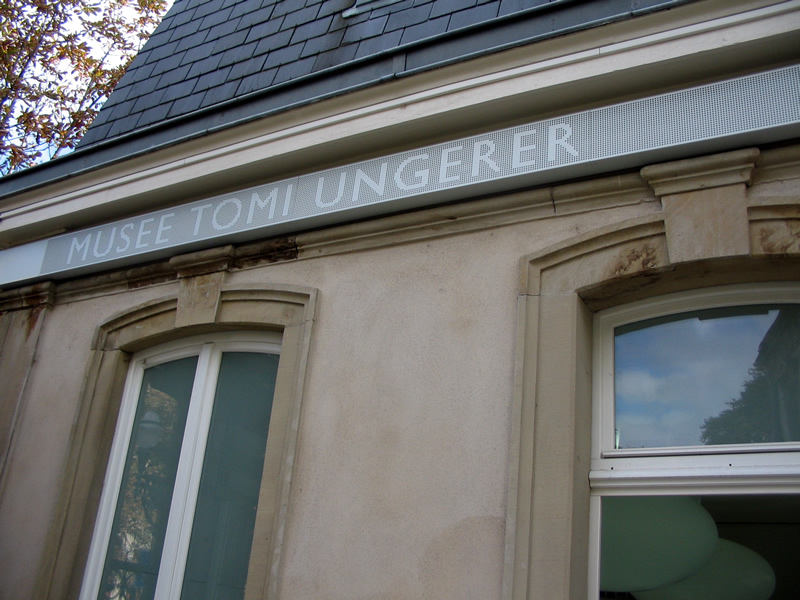

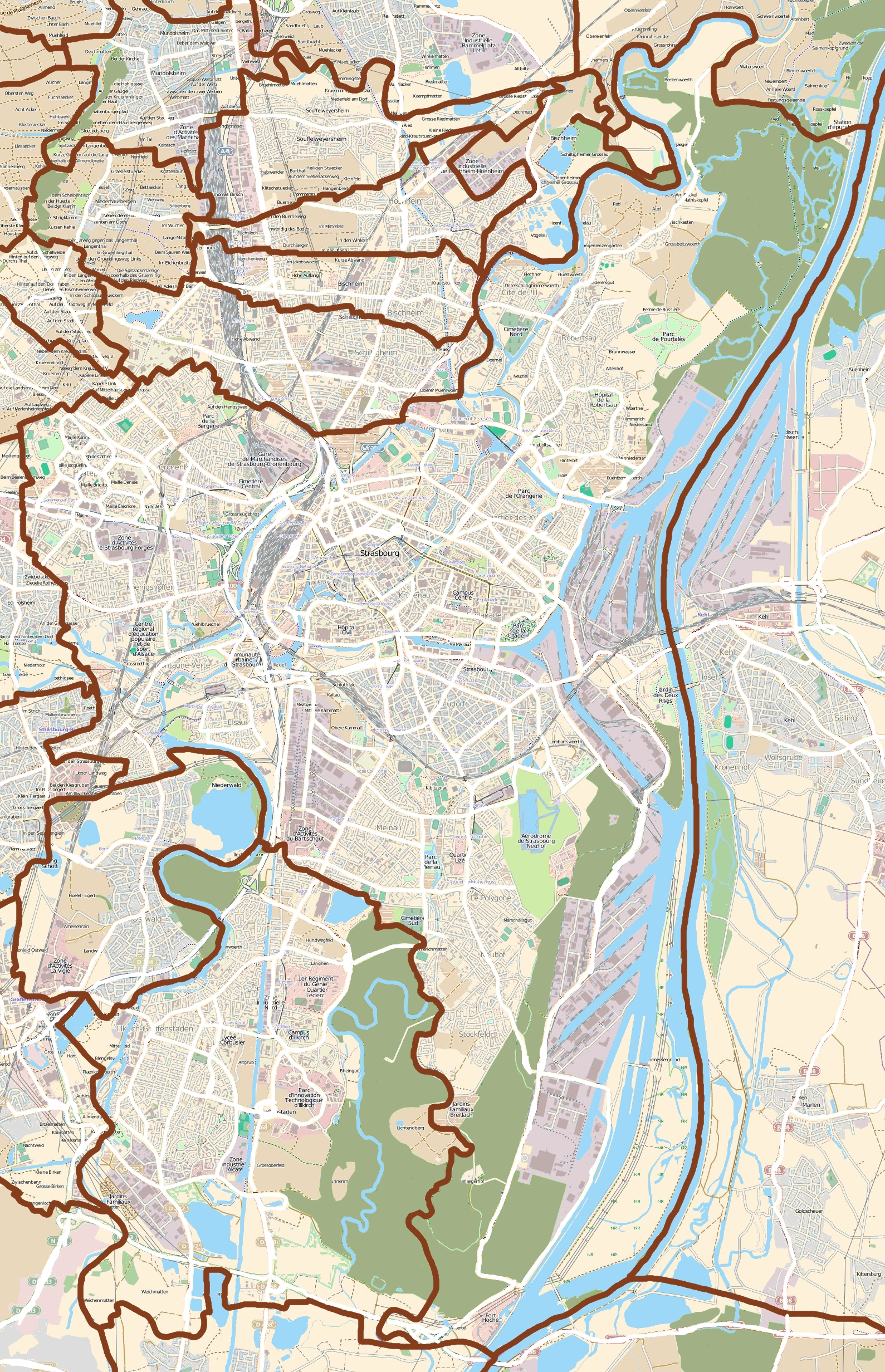
- Location within Strasbourg
- Coordinates: 48.585694°N 7.755139°E
- Website: en.musees.strasbourg.eu/museum-tomi-ungerer

Musée Tomi Ungerer/Centre international de l’illustration is a museum in Strasbourg in the Bas-Rhin department of France. Opened in November 2007, it is dedicated to the work of Strasbourg-born artist Tomi Ungerer and displays 11,000 graphic works of all kind by Ungerer and some of his most famous colleagues (Saul Steinberg, Ronald Searle, André François...) as well as Ungerer's large collection of ancient toys and regular, special exhibitions.

The museum is located in one half of the former Villa Greiner, a spacious villa built in 1884, and spread over three floors. The ground floor is dedicated to Ungerer's work as a children's book illustrator, the first floor is dedicated to his work as a political caricaturist and satirical cartoonist. The basement — not accessible for children — is dedicated to his erotic and semi-pornographic drawings.

As of 31 December 2015, the collection held 24,170 pieces.

== See also ==
- Cabinet des estampes et des dessins (Strasbourg)

== Bibliography ==
- Musée Tomi Ungerer: la collection, Éditions des musées de la ville de Strasbourg 2007, ISBN 978-2-35125-051-8
