= Allumette: A Fable =

Book by Tomi Ungerer

- Author: Tomi Ungerer
- Publication date: 1974

Allumette; A Fable, with Due Respect to Hans Christian Andersen, the Grimm Brothers, and the Honorable Ambrose Bierce, by Tomi Ungerer, was originally published in 1974. It is a "reimagining" of "The Little Match Girl" by Hans Christian Andersen. The book's extended title references Andersen, for "The Little Match Girl", as well as fairy tale authors the Brothers Grimm, and satirist Ambrose Bierce. The book was initially published in 1974, and carried in the United States by Parents' Magazine Press and Scholastic, both bargain retailers. It was also briefly reprinted in 1986, but has since gone out of print again.

== Plot synopsis ==
Unlike the Anderson tale, the book's heroine, Allumette, does not die a death in the cold. Rather, she gets everything she has ever wished for—and uses the power of that original wish to effect the betterment of society as a whole.

Ungerer's illustrations help form the world of Allumette, who lives in a dump surrounded by abandoned cars and playful rats. This stands in contrast with illustrations of the wealthy and powerful, shown pampered and with material possessions beyond rationality. Both in illustrative style and tone, the book is reminiscent of Maurice Sendak, particularly the books In The Night Kitchen and We Are All in the Dumps with Jack and Guy.

== Excerpt ==
The book begins as such:

Summer and winter, spring and fall,

Allumete dressed in rags.

She had no home. She had no parents.
