= Cabinet des estampes et des dessins =

Museum in Strasbourg, France

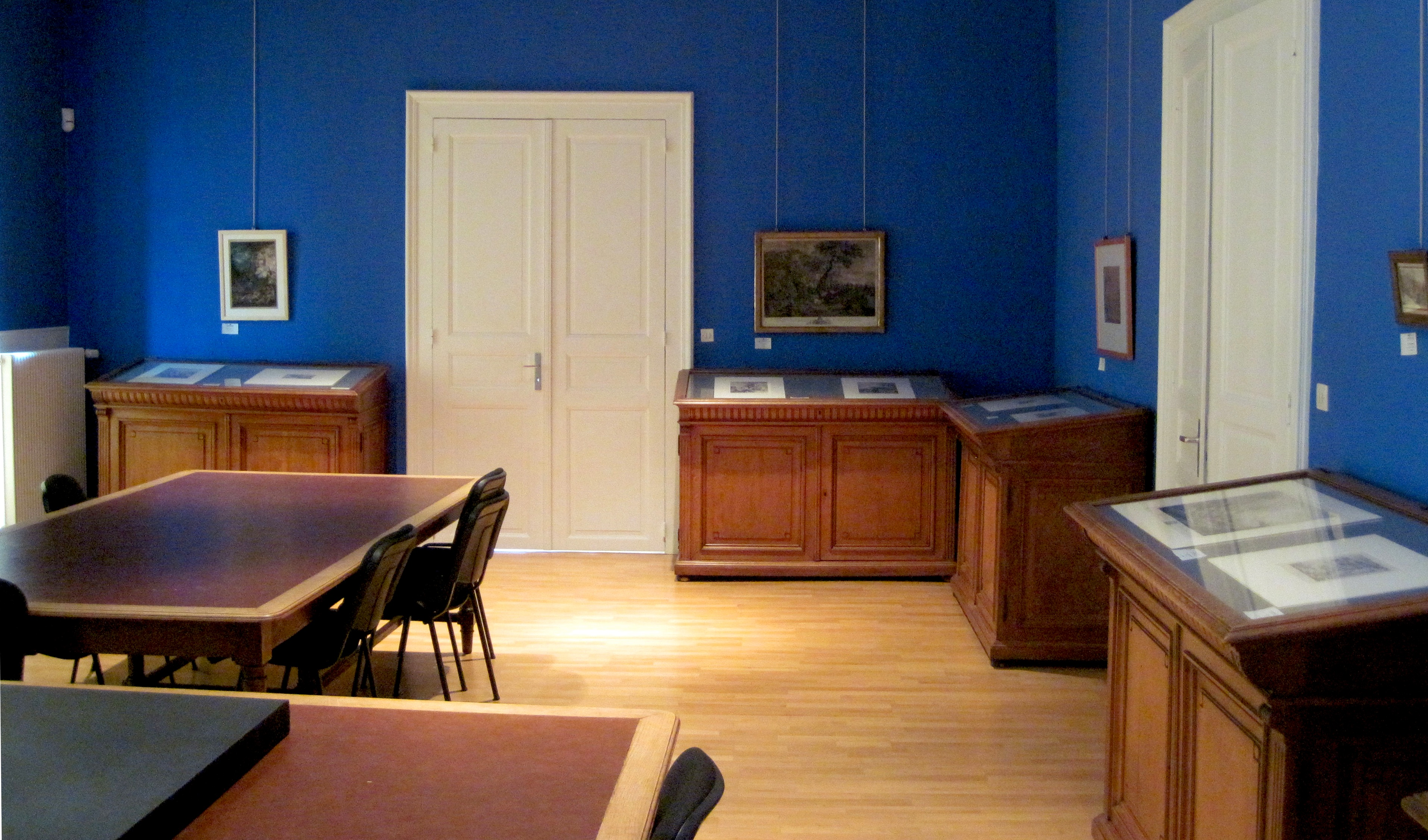

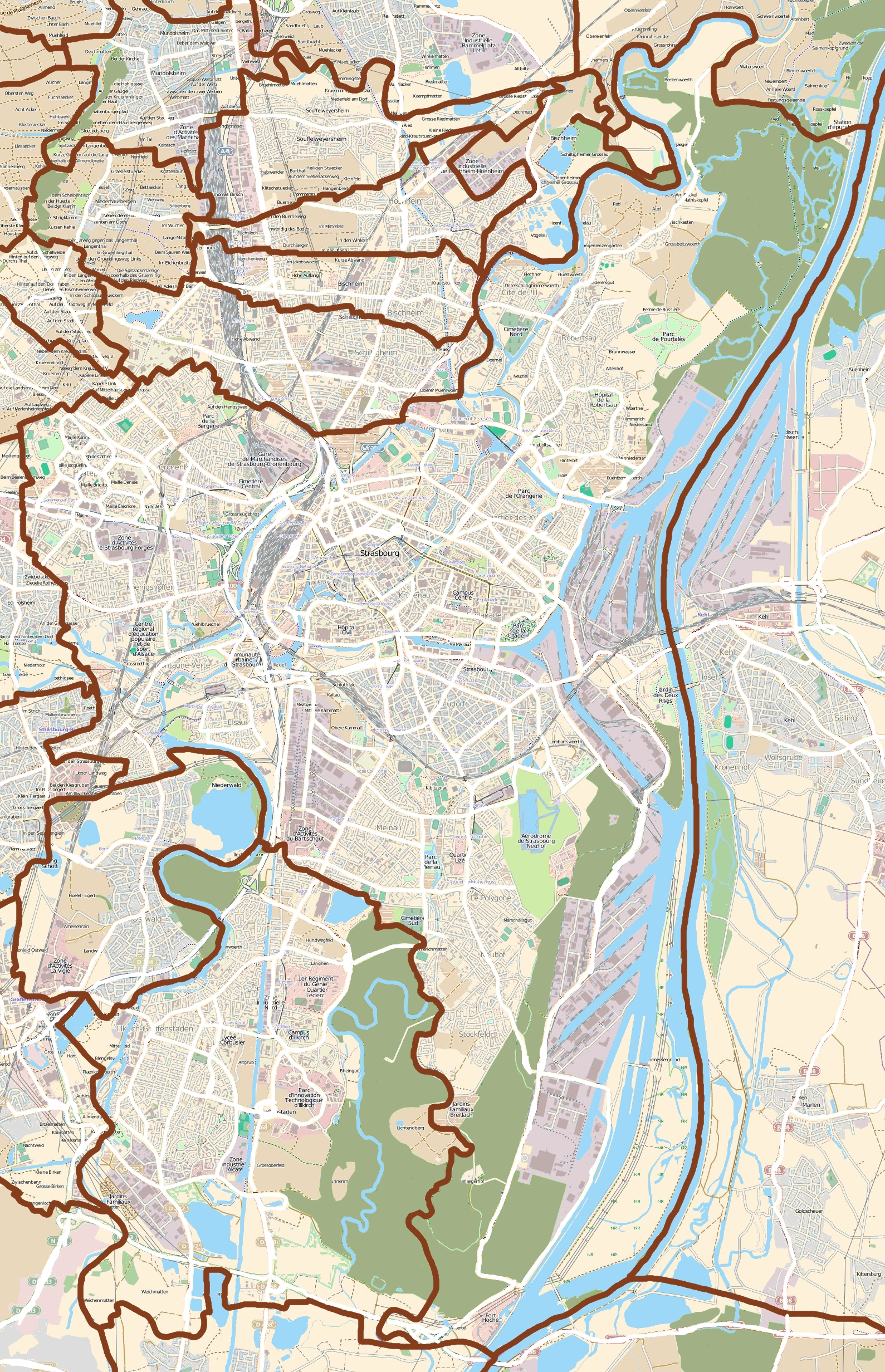
- Location within Strasbourg
- Coordinates: 48°34′52″N 7°45′03″E
- Website: en.musees.strasbourg.eu/print-room

The Cabinet des estampes et des dessins (Print room) is a museum in Strasbourg in the Bas-Rhin department of France. It is dedicated to the municipal collection of prints (estampes) and drawings (dessins), but also woodcuts and lithographs, covering a period of five centuries from the 14th to the 19th. The municipal collections of graphic art since 1870 are displayed in the Musée d'art moderne et contemporain and in the Tomi Ungerer Museum.

The collection was founded in 1890 by Wilhelm von Bode during his rebuilding and reorganisation of the city's art collections. It includes works by Albrecht Dürer, Albrecht Altdorfer, Hans Baldung, Hendrik Goltzius, Antonio del Pollaiuolo, Honoré Daumier, Philip James de Loutherbourg and the Master of the Drapery Studies. The Cabinet des estampes et des dessins was estimated to house 200,291 pieces as of 31 December 2015, and was notably enriched in 2019 by a major donation of 33 drawings and 5 engravings by artists such as Giovanni Domenico Tiepolo, Jean-Honoré Fragonard, Jacques Callot, and Rembrandt.

== Bibliography ==
- Dürer, Baldung Grien, Cranach l'Ancien : collection du Cabinet des Estampes et des Dessins, Strasbourg, Musées de la ville de Strasbourg, 2008, ISBN 978-2-35125-039-6
