= Tom Major-Ball =

British music hall and circus performer

- Born: Abraham Thomas Ball; 18 May 1879; Bloxwich, Staffordshire, England
- Died: 27 March 1962 (aged 82); Brixton, London, England
- Occupation: Music hall performer
- Years active: 1896−1930
- Spouses: Kitty Grant (m. 1910; died 1928) Gwendolyn Minny Coates (m. 1929)
- Children: 6, including Terry and John

Tom Major-Ball (born Abraham Thomas Ball; 18 May 1879 – 27 March 1962) was a British music hall and circus performer. He was the father of John Major, Prime Minister of the United Kingdom from 1990 to 1997.

== Early life ==
He was born Abraham Thomas Ball in Bloxwich, Staffordshire, on 18 May 1879. He was a son of Abraham Ball, a bricklayer, and his wife Sarah Ann Marrah or O'Marrah who was of Irish and possibly Welsh descent. The family also had an adopted son, Alfred. When he was five years old, Major-Ball and his parents emigrated to the United States, where he spent his formative years in Pennsylvania, where his father worked as a steel worker, initially in Pittsburgh, then Philadelphia, and finally Fall Hollow, a small village near Braddock. He later worked as a vaudeville performer and trapeze artist in travelling circuses.

== Early adult life and stage career ==
Circa 1896 the family moved back to the UK, to the Walsall area, where Tom Major developed a successful music hall career. He claimed to have performed at "every theatre in England, Wales, Scotland and Ireland". In 1901 Major fathered an out-of-wedlock child (Tom Moss) with Mary Moss, a married woman. His music hall act was as a comedian and song-and-dance man, chiefly with Kitty Grant; a relationship grew, though this remained secret as Kitty was married. Kitty called herself Drum for the stage effect of "Drum and Ball"; Tom later added "Major" to the name when the double act was renamed "Drum and Major". He sometimes performed under the name Tom Major.

In July 1903 he and Kitty toured for a year in South America, where Major worked for a period as a ranch-hand in Argentina and later at a casino in Buenos Aires, before getting caught up in a civil war in Uruguay, where he was forced to enlist in a local militia. On the couple's return to the United Kingdom in April 1904 they resumed touring music halls and their performing careers flourished. On 18 February 1906, he and Kitty became founder members at the creation of the Variety Artistes' Federation at the Vaudeville Club in London. They later married in 1910, following the death of Kitty's husband David Grant. A heart condition prevented Tom from enlisting for active service in World War I.

In 1923 Major had an affair with Alice Maud Frankland, which resulted in the birth of a child, Kathleen, on 6 October 1923.

Kitty died in June 1928 following a stage accident in which she was struck by a steel beam. With music halls suffering a decline as cinemas became more popular with the public, Tom gave up his performing career in 1930.

== Later career and life ==
Tom married the dancer Gwendolyn (Gwen) Minny Coates on 4 May 1929, who had helped nurse Kitty in her final weeks. With his stage career now over, the couple moved to 260 Longfellow Road, Worcester Park, Surrey, where he founded Major's Garden Ornaments, manufacturing garden gnomes and other garden ornaments. The couple had four children: Thomas Aston (b. June 1929, who died shortly after birth), Pat Major-Ball (later Dessoy) (1930-2017), Terry Major-Ball (1932-2007) and John Major (b. 29 March 1943). The ornaments business prospered and the family achieved a reasonable middle-class standard of living, described by John Major as being "comfortable but not well off." The family owned a car, and both Pat and Terry were able to go to private school. This was not to last however, as World War II saw the business lose most of its customers and suppliers.

By the early 1950s the business was in such serious trouble that Tom Major was forced to seek out a loan which was then recalled, resulting in severe financial difficulties for the family. The family were no longer able to afford to live in Worcester Park, and they moved to a cramped rented flat at Coldharbour Lane, Brixton owned by Tom Moss, Major's (illegitimate) son. Tom Major sought to move the family to Canada, but his application was rejected due to his poor eyesight. Terry kept the business going, and it was later sold in 1959. The money from the sale enabled the family to move to a larger residence at 80 Burton Road, Brixton.

Tom Major-Ball died on 27 March 1962. It is claimed by John Major that when his father was dying, "every act in the country trooped through to perform at the bed of their dying fellow artiste."

His widow, Gwen, survived him by more than eight years; dying in September 1970 at the age of 65, shortly before John's marriage to Norma Wagstaff.

After John Major became Prime Minister, there was considerable media interest in his father's colourful background. Journalist Bruce Anderson described Tom Major-Ball as "one of the most fascinating characters of the century".

== Legacy ==
It has been suggested by writer Nicholas Pegg that David Bowie got the idea of the character Major Tom's name in his song Space Oddity from seeing an old circus poster featuring fellow Brixton resident Tom Major.

== Sources ==
- Seldon, Anthony (1998) [1997]. Major: A Political Life. London: Phoenix Books. ISBN 978-0753801451.
- Major, John (2000) [1999]. John Major: The Autobiography. London: HarperCollins. ISBN 978-0-00-257004-6.
- Major, John (2012). My Old Man: A Personal History of Music Hall. London: HarperCollins. ISBN 978-0-00-745014-5.
