= Garden gnome =

Lawn ornament figurines

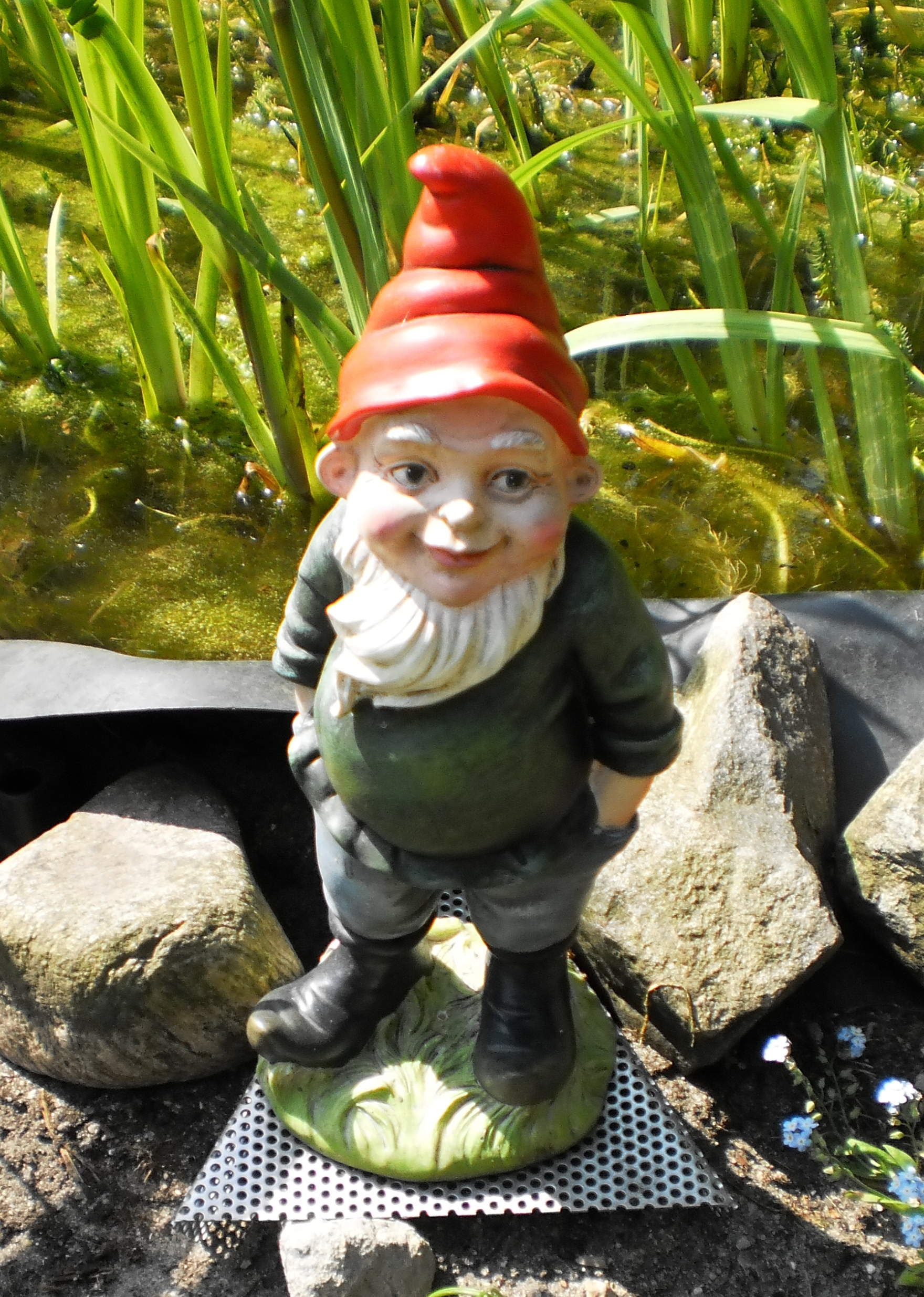
A German garden gnome

Garden gnomes (German: Gartenzwerge, lit. 'garden dwarfs') are lawn ornament figurines of small humanoid creatures based on the mythological creature and diminutive spirit which occur in Renaissance magic and alchemy, known as gnomes. They also draw on the German folklore of the dwarf.

Traditionally, the garden figurines depict male dwarfs wearing red pointy hats. Typically, gnomes stand between one and two feet (30 and 60 cm). Originating as a decoration for the wealthy in Europe, garden gnomes are now prevalent in gardens and lawns throughout the Western world, among all social classes. They are regarded by some as kitsch.

== History ==
=== Ancient predecessors ===
In ancient Rome, small stone statues depicting the Greco-Roman fertility god Priapus, also a protector of beehives, flocks, and vineyards, were frequently placed in Roman gardens. Gnomes as magical creatures were first described during the Renaissance period by Swiss alchemist Paracelsus as "diminutive figures two spans in height who did not like to mix with humans". During this period, stone "grotesques", which were typically garishly painted, 1-metre-tall (3.3 ft) figurines, were commonly placed in the gardens of the wealthy. Among the figures depicted were gobbi (Italian for hunchbacks). In particular, Jacques Callot produced 21 versions of gobbi, which he engraved and printed in 1616.

=== 18th and 19th centuries ===
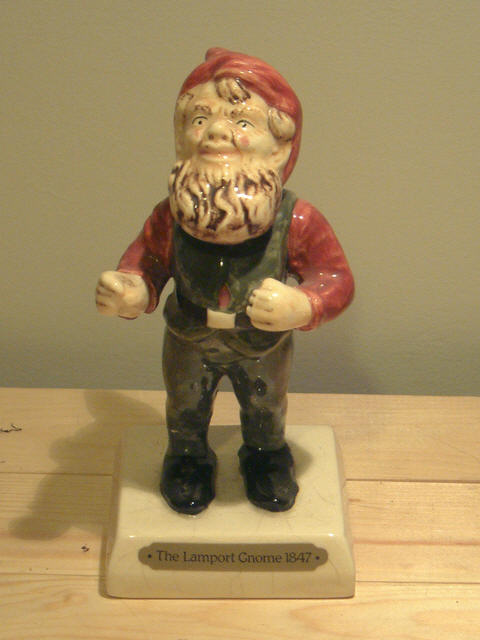
Replica of Lampy, Charles Isham's 1847 terracotta gnome from Germany. The original is on display at Lamport Hall.

By the late 18th century, gnome-like figurines made of wood or porcelain, known by names including "dwarves", had become popular household decorations in some parts of Europe. In particular, the area surrounding the town of Brienz in Switzerland was known for their production of wooden house dwarves. In Germany, these figurines became conflated with pre-existing folk stories and beliefs about dwarves (Zwerge; singular Zwerg) that they believed helped around the mines and on the farm.

The Dresden company Baehr and Maresch had small ceramic statues of "dwarves" or "little folk" in stock as early as 1841. Hence, while the claim has been contested, some credit Baehr and Maresch with creating the first garden gnomes.(German: Gartenzwerge). Within less than 10 years, statues of dwarves had spread from the provinces of Saxony and Thuringia, in particular, across Germany and into France. The manufacture of dwarves spread across Germany, with numerous other large and small manufacturers coming in and out of the business, each having its own particular style of design.

Garden gnomes spread to other countries in Europe in the 1840s and became particularly popular in France and Britain. In 1847, Sir Charles Isham, brought 21 terracotta gnomes manufactured in Germany by Philip Griebel back to Britain where they were called "gnomes" in English, and placed in the gardens of Isham's home, Lamport Hall in Northamptonshire. Nicknamed "Lampy", the only gnome of the original batch to survive is on display at Lamport Hall and insured for £1 million.

Use of the term "garden gnome" may originate from fact that German catalogues sold ornaments of dwarfs under the name gnomen-figuren, meaning miniature figurines.

From around 1860 onwards, Gräfenroda, a town in Thuringia long known for its ceramics, became increasingly associated with production of garden gnomes.

=== Twentieth century ===
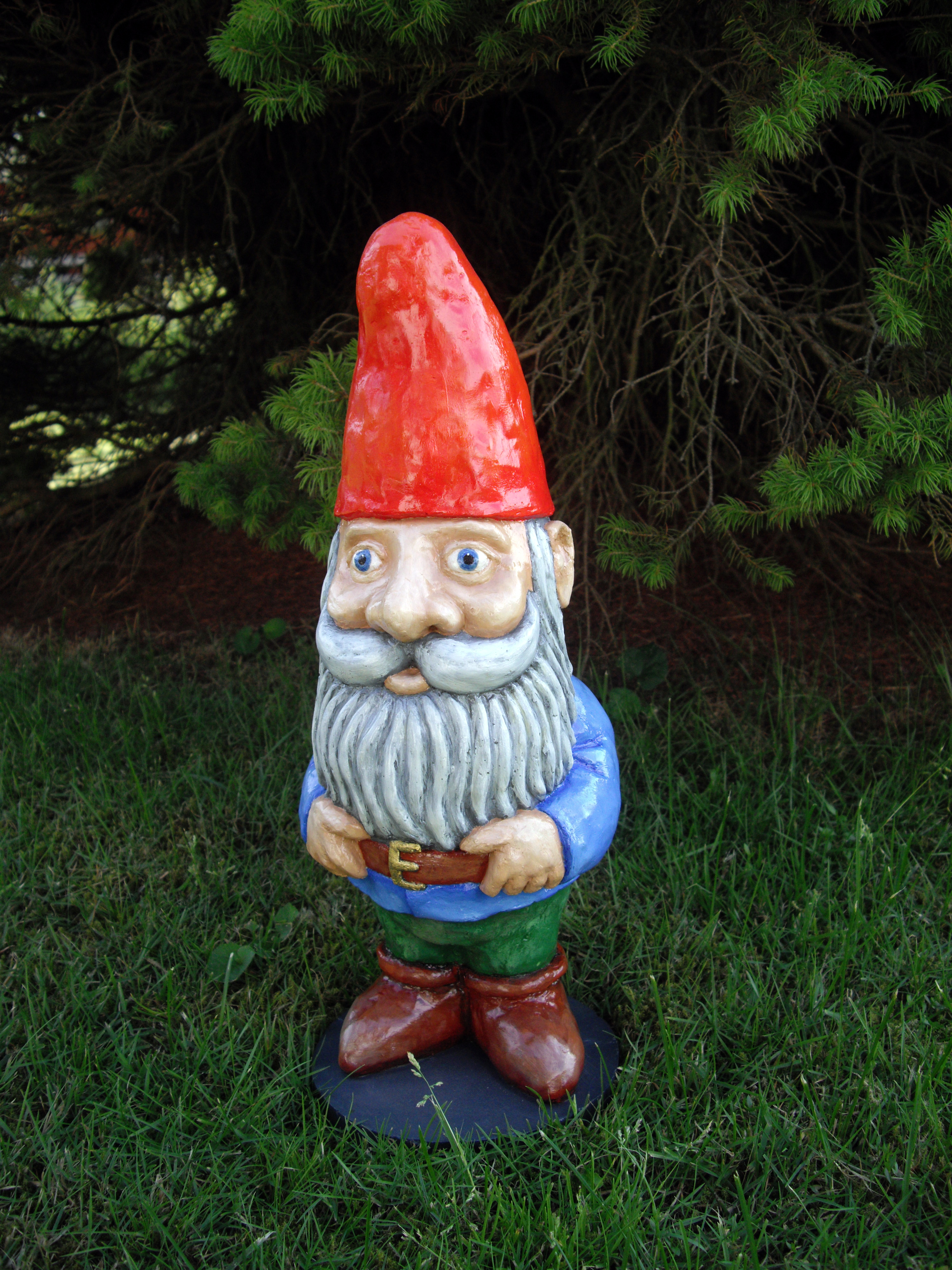
Gnome figure in Sweden

Garden gnomes were further popularized when Sir Frank Crisp, the owner of the second largest collection of garden gnomes in the UK, opened his Friar Park, Henley-on-Thames estate to the public at least once a week from 1910 to 1919. It was here where garden enthusiasts and visitors from around the world perhaps saw garden gnomes for the first time.

The reputation of German gnomes declined after World War I, but they became popular again in the 1930s following Disney's animated film Snow White and the Seven Dwarfs, when more working-class people were able to purchase them. Tom Major-Ball (father of former British prime minister John Major) was the most notable producer at that time with his company Major's Garden Ornaments. World War II and the years following saw a decline in the industry, causing most producers to halt their manufacture.

Garden gnomes saw a resurgence in popularity again in the 1970s with the creation of more humorous types of gnomes. In the 1990s, travelling gnome and garden gnome pranks became popular and made national news at times, where people steal a garden gnome from an unknowing person's lawn and then send the owner photos of the gnome as a practical joke before returning it.

=== Twenty-first century ===
Philip Griebel's descendants are still producing garden gnomes in Germany. As of 2008, there were an estimated 25 million garden gnomes in Germany. A recent trend has introduced miniature gnomes of only a few inches in height.

== Types of garden gnomes ==
Garden gnomes are typically male, often bearded, usually wear red caps and often have pipes. They are often shown pursuing leisurely pastimes such as fishing or napping.

Gnomes may be made from terracotta clay slip (runny clay) poured into molds. This is allowed to set up and the excess emptied from the center, leaving a clay shell. The gnome is removed from the mold when firm, allowed to dry and then fired in a kiln until hard. Once cooled, the gnome is painted. More modern gnomes are made from resins and similar materials.

Today, many different variations of garden gnomes exist, including humorous ones ranging from the lighthearted biker or barbecuing gnome, to the more sinister, such as one stabbed in the back or wearing an executioner's hood.

== In popular culture and politics ==
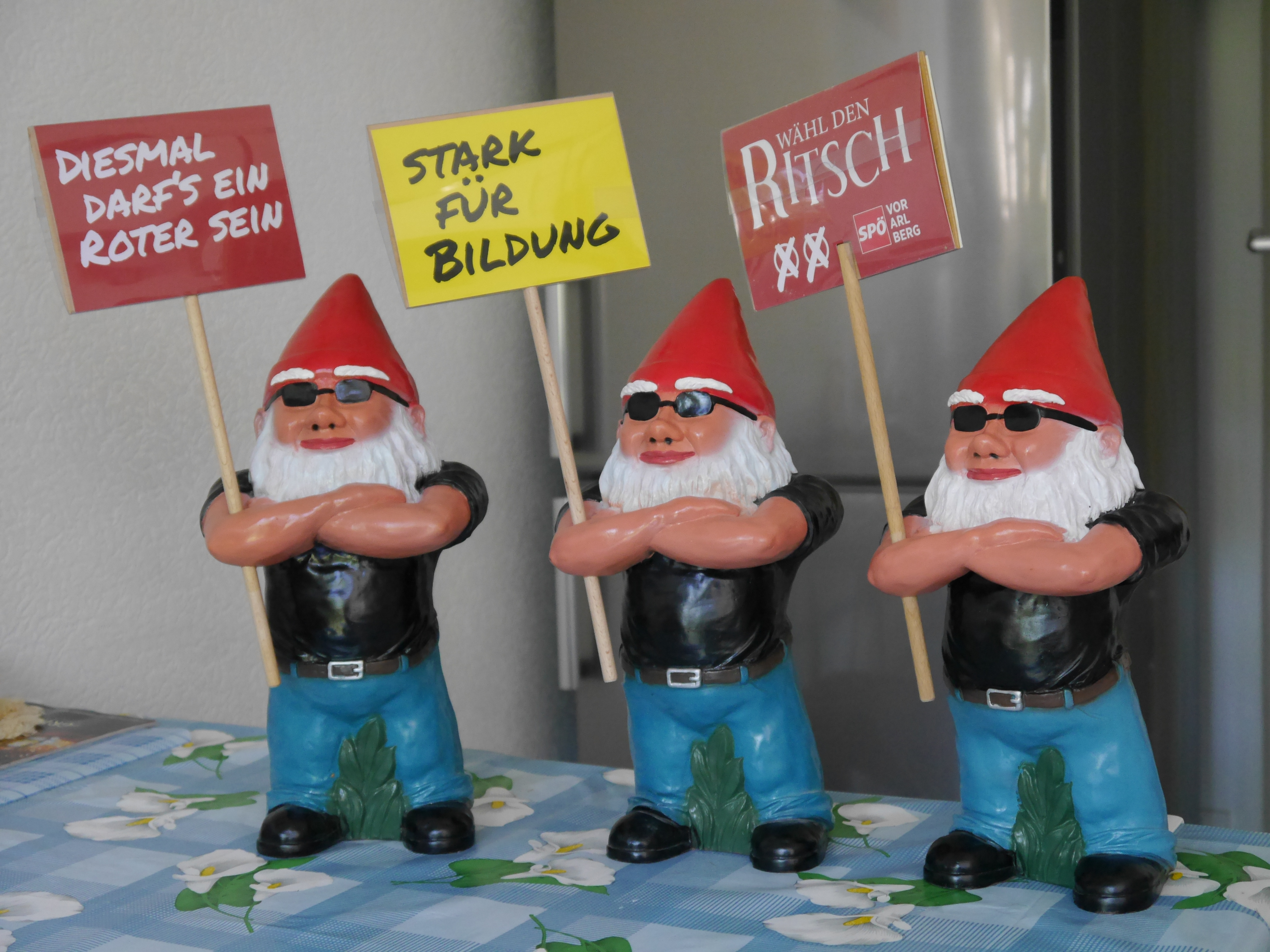
"Socialist" garden gnomes, used in a local election campaign in the Austrian province of Vorarlberg

Gnomes have become controversial in serious gardening circles in the United Kingdom, and were for a time banned from the prestigious Chelsea Flower Show, as the organisers claimed that they detract from the garden designs. Gnome enthusiasts accused the organisers of snobbery, as garden gnomes are popular in the gardens of working class and suburban households. The ban was lifted during 2013 to mark the show's centenary.

- In the Italian movie The Monster (1994), the main character Loris, played by Roberto Benigni, is accused of stealing the garden gnome Bashful.
- A subplot in the 2001 French movie Amélie revolves around a "travelling" garden gnome.
- A two-foot-tall (60 cm) garden gnome with a long, white beard, red conical hat and blue coat is the central figure in Travelocity's Roaming Gnome advertising campaign which was launched in January 2004.
- The 2007 video game Half-Life 2: Episode Two features the unlockable achievement "Little Rocket Man" that requires the player to bring a garden gnome from the start to the end and place him into a rocket. The gnome was later given the name "Gnome Chompski" as a reference to Noam Chomsky and has appeared in the Valve Corporation games Left 4 Dead 2 and Half-Life: Alyx. In 2020, Gabe Newell partnered with Wētā Workshop and Rocket Lab to launch a real-life garden gnome into space.
- Gnomeo and Juliet is a 2011 British-American CGI film that is inspired by the tragedy of Romeo and Juliet featuring garden gnomes as the characters. In 2018, its sequel, Sherlock Gnomes, was released.
- The Social Democratic Party of Austria (SPÖ) used garden gnomes, which they called "Coolmen", in their campaign for the 2014 regional elections in Vorarlberg. It was intended as an ironic pun since the SPÖ historically performed poorly in elections in this part of Austria and considered itself to be a political "dwarf". The campaign placed 20,000 Coolmen holding small posters with short slogans along highly frequented roads. The party made a police report after 400 of them went missing, drawing attention from the international media.
- The 2010 video game Fable III includes a side mission where a collection of garden gnomes are given magical properties, which the player character must collect throughout the world.
- In the children's television series Pinkalicious & Peterrific (based on the book series by Victoria Kann), a garden gnome named Norman, who was a bit grumpy but a gentle gnome, befriends Pinkalicious and her friends.
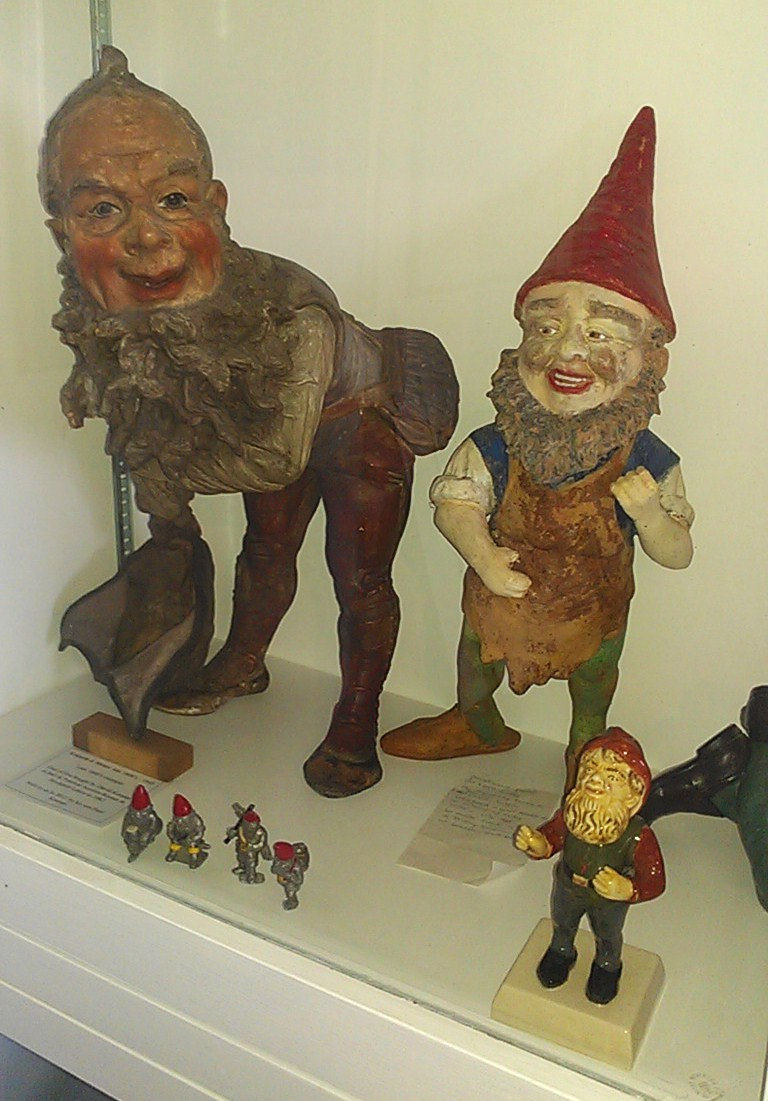
Historical gnomes in a museum display at the Gnome Reserve in Devon UK

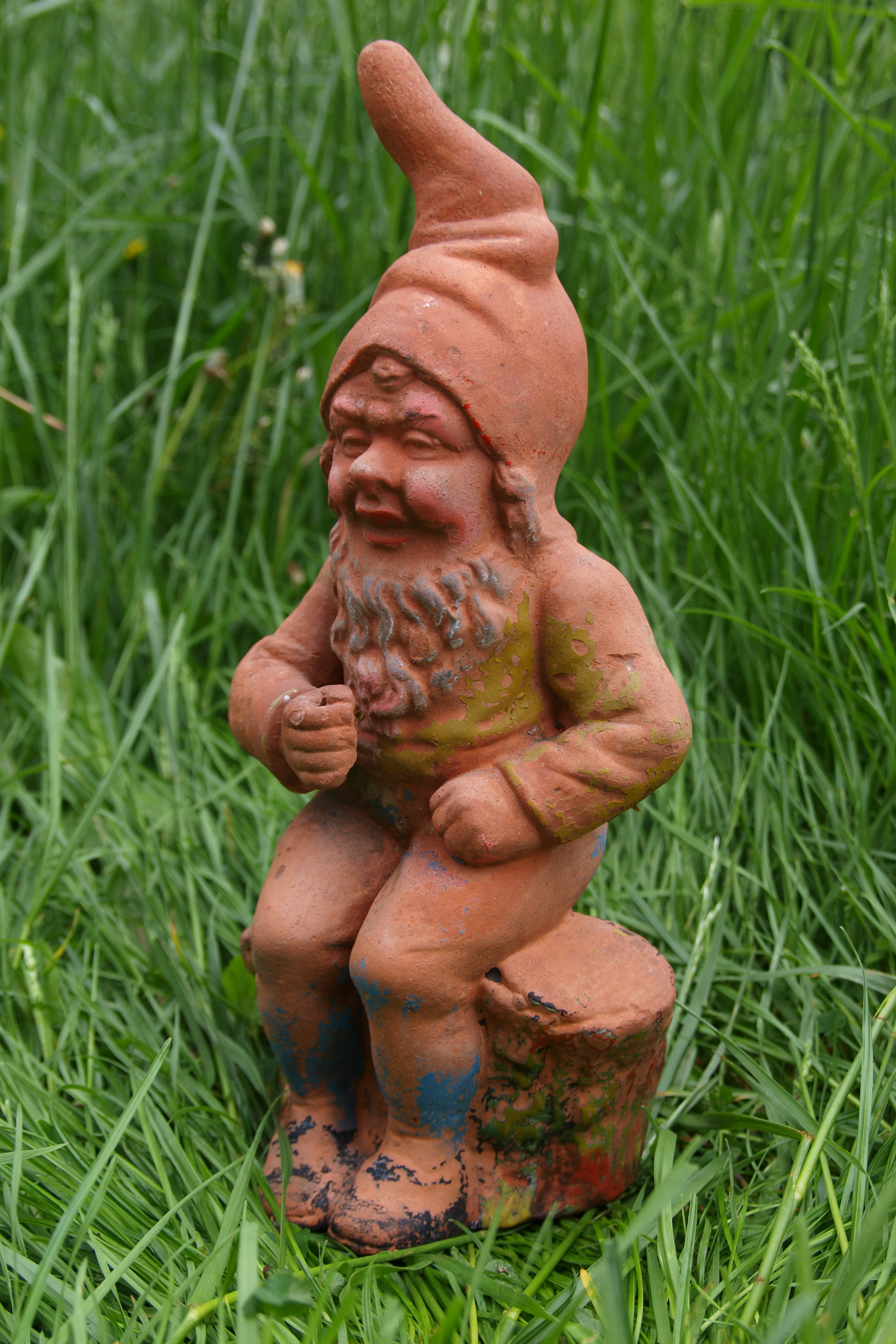
Traditional German garden dwarf. Probably manufactured in the first half of the 20th century in Gräfenrode, Thuringia, Germany.

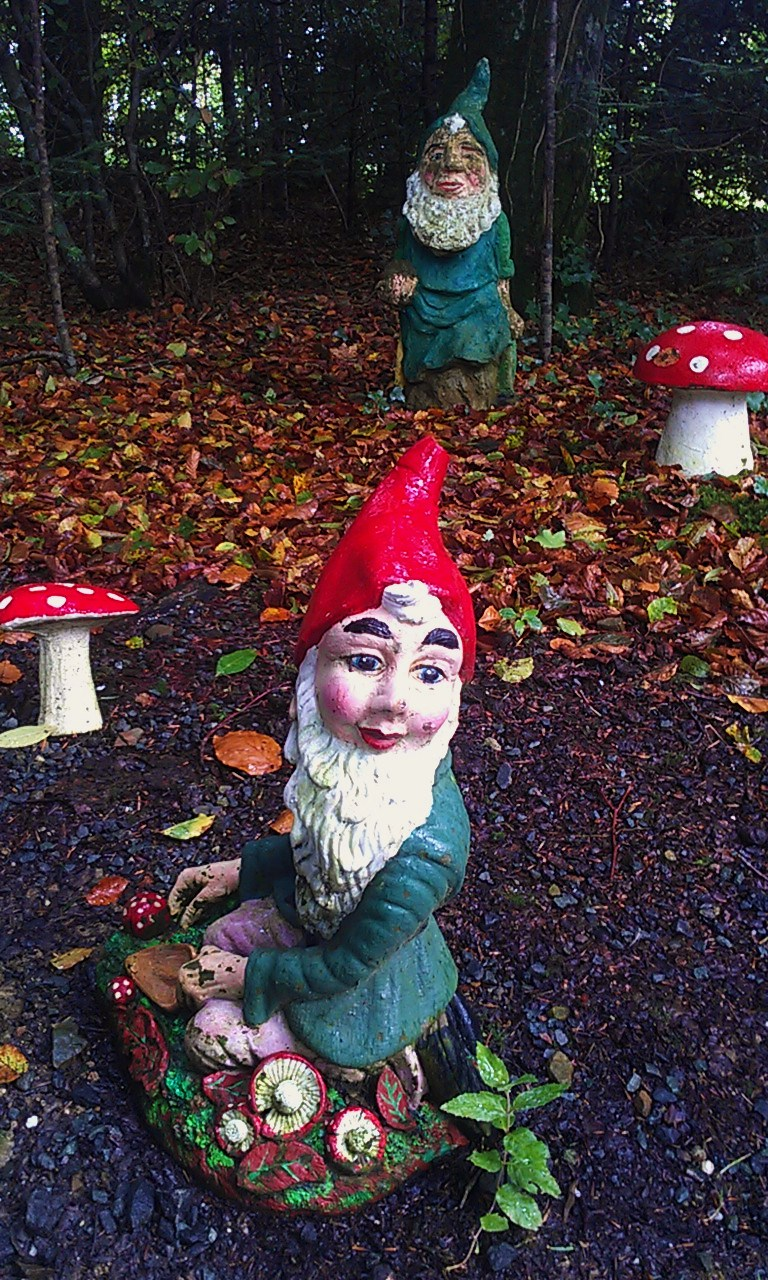
Gnome at the Gnome Reserve, Devon, UK

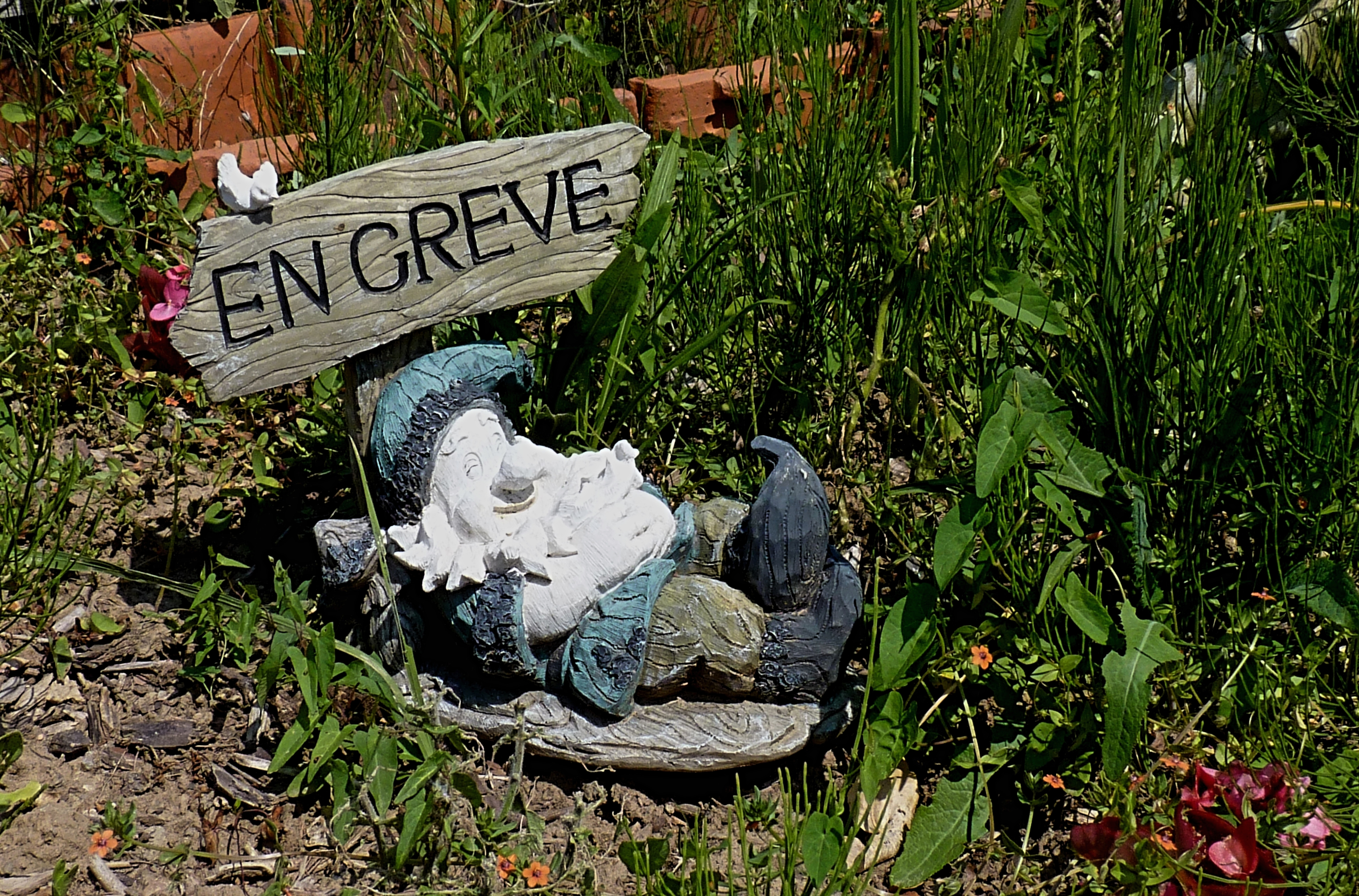
Traditional grey gnome (En grève means "On strike")

== See also ==
- Garden hermit
- Garden ornament
- Gnome Reserve
- Travelling gnome
