= Flat Stanley =

Children's book written by Jeff Brown

- Front cover of the first edition (1964)
- Author: Jeff Brown (1964–2003; 2006)
- Illustrator: Tomi Ungerer (1964); Tony Ross (1992); Steve Bjorkman (1998); Scott Nash (2003); Macky Pamintuan (2010); Jon Mitchell (2012); Rob Biddulph (2019)
- Language: English
- Genre: Children's literature
- Publisher: Harper & Row (1964–1985); HarperCollins (1990–2003); Scholastic (2006; 2009–present); Methuen Publishing (UK, 1964–1998)/Egmont Group (UK, 1998–present)
- Publication date: 1964–2003; 2006; 2009–present
- Publication place: United States

Flat Stanley is an American children's book series written by author Jeff Brown (1926–2003). The idea for the book began as a bedtime story for Brown's sons, which Brown turned into the first Flat Stanley book. The first book featured illustrations by Tomi Ungerer and was published in 1964. Brown did not continue the series until 19 years later, when he published five more books: Stanley and the Magic Lamp, Stanley in Space, Stanley’s Christmas Adventure, Invisible Stanley, and Stanley, Flat Again!

By 2003, the Flat Stanley series had sold almost one million copies in the United States, and the stories had been translated into French, German, Spanish, Italian, Japanese, and Hebrew.

Since Brown's death in 2003, other children's book authors, including Sara Pennypacker and Josh Greenhut, have continued the series under a new name, Flat Stanley's Worldwide Adventures.

In 2009, a musical adaptation, also entitled Flat Stanley, opened at the Djanogly Theatre, Nottingham. It featured a script by Mike Kenny and songs by Julian Butler. The musical was well received and was revived in 2014 for a short tour.

== Synopsis of the original book ==
The book recounts the adventures of Stanley Lambchop after he is squashed flat by a bulletin board while sleeping. He is otherwise uninjured, and decides to make the best of being flat. Soon, Stanley discovers that he is able to enter locked rooms by sliding under the door. Over the course of the story, he is also rolled up to go out to a park, and he is used as a kite by his younger brother, Arthur. Another special advantage of being flat is that Flat Stanley can visit his friends in California by being mailed in a large envelope, allowing him to avoid the cost of a train or airplane ticket. Later, Stanley even helps catch art thieves at a museum by disguising himself as a painting on the wall. However, Stanley eventually becomes tired of his flatness, and Arthur restores Stanley's proper shape with a bicycle pump.

== Books in the series ==
Flat Stanley's Worldwide Adventures
- Illustrator: Macky Pamintuan
- Country: United States
- Language: English
- Genre: Children's literature
- Publisher: Scholastic
- Published: 2009–present

Books by Jeff Brown:

- Flat Stanley (1964)
- Stanley and the Magic Lamp (1983) – Stanley and Arthur discover a magic lamp containing a genie.
- Stanley In Space (1990) – The Lambchops are sent into space by the President to forge peace with a group of miniature humanoid aliens who inhabit the newly discovered planet Tyrra.
- Stanley's Christmas Adventure (1993) – Santa Claus's daughter, Sarah Christmas, arrives unexpectedly in the Lambchop household during the holiday season, and convinces them to help bring back Santa's jolly spirit.
- Invisible Stanley (1995) – After a thunderstorm occurs one night, Stanley mysteriously turns invisible.
- Stanley, Flat Again! (2003) – Stanley is hit with a rubber ball while simultaneously hitting his shoulder on a shelf, causing him to return to his flat state, from which Arthur is unable to restore Stanley back to normal. He has many unusual adventures following this odd event.

At the time of his death, Brown was in the process of rewriting the original book. The rewrite was published by Scholastic in 2006. Since then, other authors have continued the series under the name Flat Stanley's Worldwide Adventures.

Flat Stanley books by other authors:

- The Mount Rushmore Calamity (2009) – author Sara Pennypacker
- The Great Egyptian Grave Robbery (2009) – author Sara Pennypacker
- The Japanese Ninja Surprise (2009) – author Sara Pennypacker
- The Intrepid Canadian Expedition (2009) – author Sara Pennypacker
- The Amazing Mexican Secret (2010) – author Josh Greenhut
- The African Safari Discovery (2011) – author Josh Greenhut
- The Flying Chinese Wonders (2011) – author Josh Greenhut
- The Australian Boomerang Bonanza (2011) – author Josh Greenhut
- The US Capital Commotion (2011) – author Josh Greenhut
- Showdown at the Alamo (2014) – author Josh Greenhut
- Framed in France (2014) – author Josh Greenhut
- Escape to California (2014) – author David Ross
- The Midnight Ride of Flat Revere (2016) – author Kate Egan
- On a Mission for Her Majesty (2017) – author Kate Egan
- Lost in New York (2018) – author Kate Egan

== The Flat Stanley Project ==
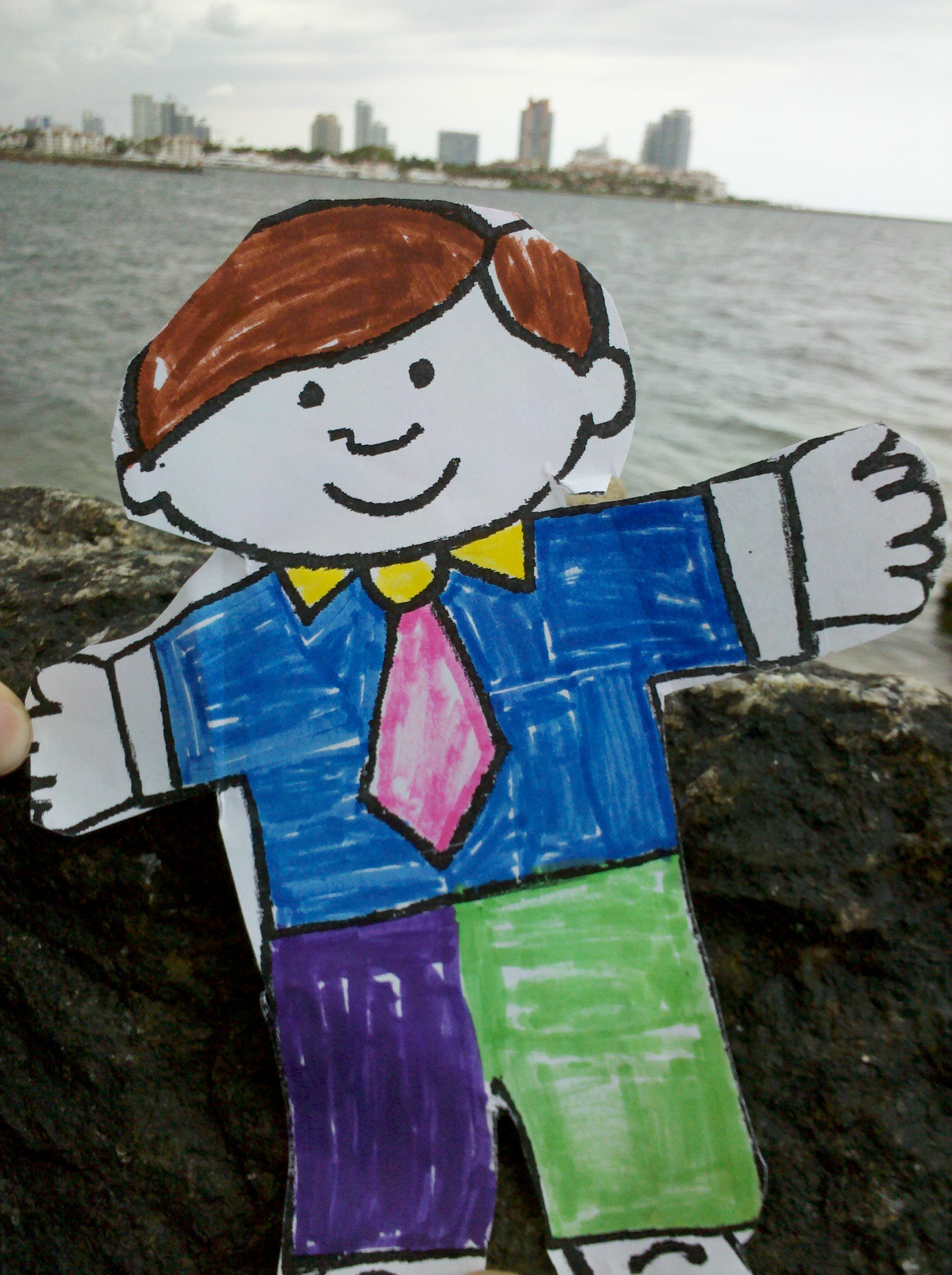
Flat Stanley braving the weather in Miami Beach

The Flat Stanley Project began in 1995 under the direction of Dale Hubert, a third grade school teacher in London, Ontario, Canada. The project is meant to facilitate letter-writing between schoolchildren as they document where Flat Stanley has accompanied them around the world. The goal of the project is to increase reading and writing skills, as well as teaching children about people and cultures from different places. Dale Hubert received the Prime Minister's Award for Teaching Excellence in 2001 for his work in creating the Flat Stanley Project.

The Flat Stanley Project provides an opportunity for students to make connections with students from other member schools who have signed up for the project. Students begin by reading the book and becoming familiar with Flat Stanley's story. Then, they create paper "Flat Stanleys" (representative drawings of the Stanley Lambchop character) and keep a journal for a few days, documenting the places and activities in which Flat Stanley is involved. Each student's Flat Stanley and its respective journal are then mailed to students at other schools. The students at those schools are asked to treat the Flat Stanley as a visiting guest and add to the respective journal, then return them both after a short period of time. The project has many similarities to the traveling gnome prank, except that the Flat Stanley Project focuses more on literacy.

As a part of the project, students may plot Flat Stanley's travels on maps and share the contents of their journals. Additionally, Flat Stanleys often return with a photo or postcard from their visit. Despite the project's traditional reliance on letters, some teachers prefer to use e-mail due to its quicker travel time.

In 2008, more than 6,000 classes from 47 countries took part in the Flat Stanley Project.

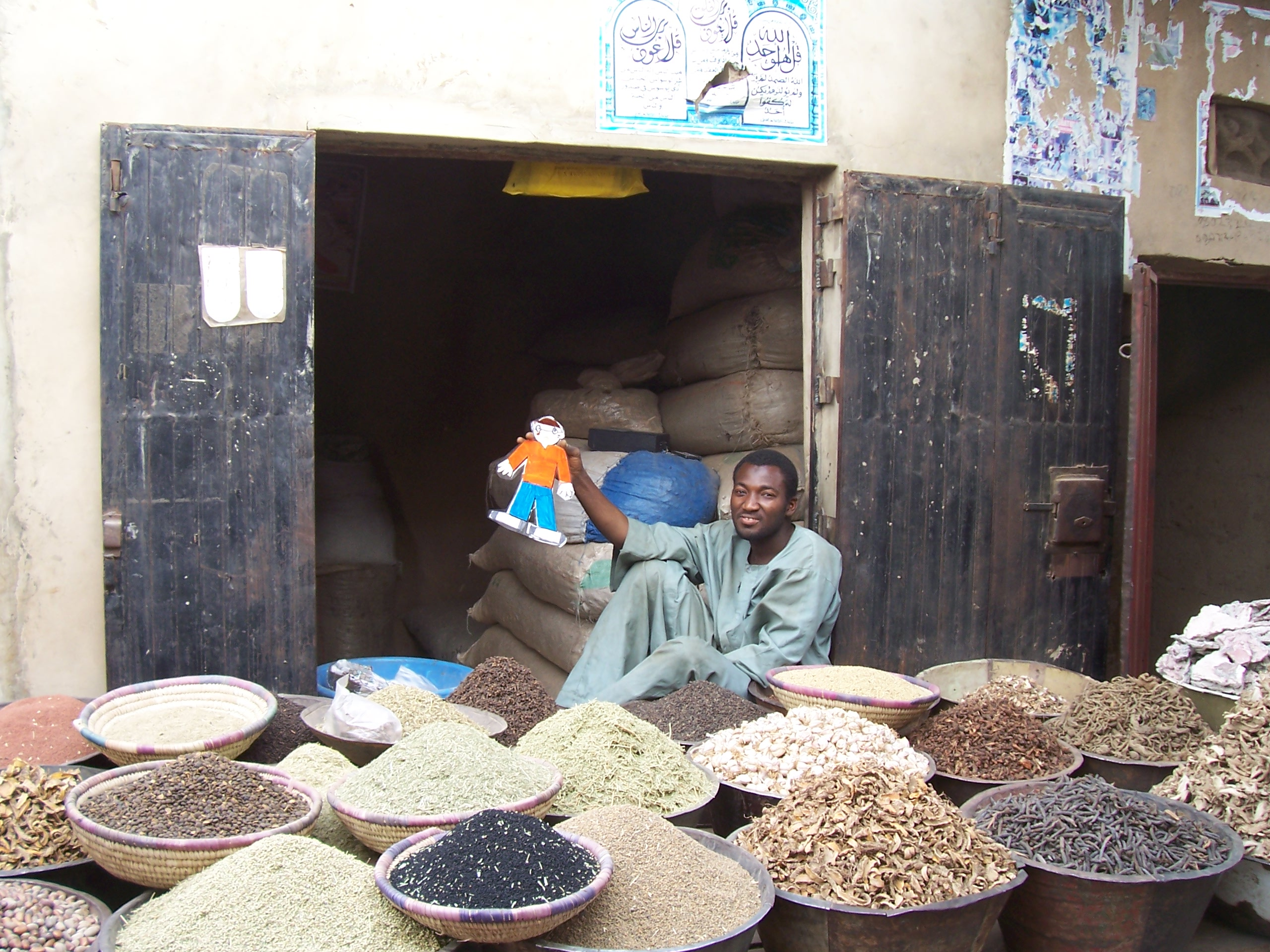
Flat Stanley befriends a shop owner in Kano, Nigeria

=== Arranging exchanges ===
Teachers can register and arrange exchanges with other classrooms on the Flat Stanley Project website. Another option is for teachers to ask students to get their parents' permission to address an envelope and send the paper doll to a friend or relative in another state.

The Flat Stanley Project uses blogs for teachers, parents and students to publish stories, describe local traditions and scenery, and post photos.

=== In popular culture ===
The project was featured in the 2004 episode of the animated TV series King of the Hill "How I Learned to Stop Worrying and Love the Alamo", in which Nancy Gribble receives a Flat Stanley in the mail. Peggy Hill and Luanne Platter photograph it in a number of dangerous situations, resulting in the school's Flat Stanley Project being canceled.

According to the February 26, 2009 broadcast of Countdown with Keith Olbermann, Flat Stanley was on board the US Airways Flight 1549, which landed safely in the Hudson River. He was carried to safety in the briefcase of his traveling companion.

In early 2010, Darren Haas, a Flat Stanley advocate and applications architect, approached Dale Hubert with the idea of turning the Flat Stanley Project concept into an app for the iPhone. The app was released in late 2010, but is no longer available in the App Store.

Also in 2010, fans of the baseball team St. Louis Cardinals were asked (via the team website) to petition US President Barack Obama to award the Presidential Medal of Freedom to Baseball Hall of Famer Stan Musial. A "Flat Stan" downloadable cutout figure was made available to encourage Cardinals fans to take photos with Musial's caricature and send them in as petitions.

Flat Stanley appears in the 2014 Jeff Kinney novel Diary of a Wimpy Kid: The Long Haul.

In 2022, cast member Sarah Sherman held up a Flat Stanley during the closing credits of an episode of Saturday Night Live.

Dog Man Unleashed – the second in the series of Dog Man novels – contains a homage to Flat Stanley: the antagonist Petey feigns a crush by cutting out a cardboard likeness of himself, and inserts it under a bulletin board. With the cardboard likeness also coming to life as another antagonist.
