= Tomi Ungerer =

French artist and writer (1931–2019)

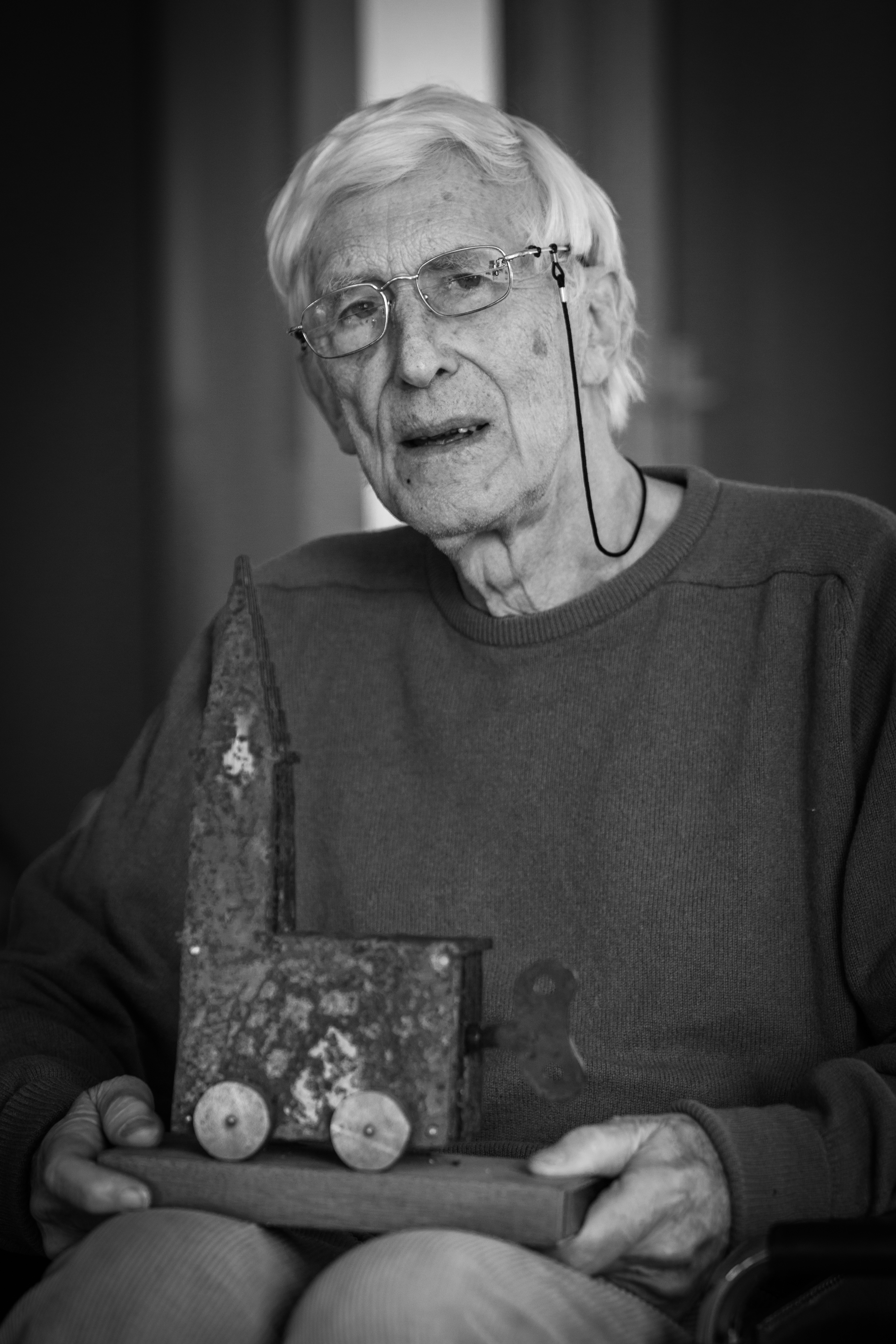
- Ungerer in 2014
- Born: Jean-Thomas Ungerer; 28 November 1931; Strasbourg, Alsace, France
- Died: 9 February 2019 (aged 87); Cork, Ireland
- Education: Municipal School for Decorative Arts (Strasbourg)
- Occupations: Artist, illustrator, writer
- Writing career
- Period: 1957–2019
- Genres: Children's picture books, erotic literature
- Notable works: Flat Stanley; Moon Man
- Notable awards: Commander of the Legion d'Honneur (2018); Hans Christian Andersen Award for Illustration (1998)
- Website: www.tomiungerer.com

Jean-Thomas "Tomi" Ungerer (German pronunciation: [ˈtoːmi ˈʊŋəʁɐ]; 28 November 1931 – 9 February 2019) was a French artist and writer from Alsace . He published over 140 books ranging from children's books to adult works and from the fantastic to the autobiographical. Ungerer was known for sharp social satire and witty aphorisms. He is also famous as a cartoonist and designer of political posters and film posters.

Ungerer received the international Hans Christian Andersen Medal in 1998 for his "lasting contribution" as a children's illustrator.

== Biography ==
Ungerer was born on 28 November 1931, in Strasbourg in Alsace, France, the youngest of four children to Alice (Essler) and Theo Ungerer. The family moved to Logelbach, near Colmar, after Theodore—an artist, engineer, and astronomical clock manufacturer—died in 1936. Ungerer also lived through the German occupation of Alsace when the family home was requisitioned by the Wehrmacht.

As a young man, Ungerer was inspired by the illustrations appearing in The New Yorker magazine, particularly the work of Saul Steinberg.

In 1957, the year after moving to the United States, Harper & Row published Ungerer's first children's book, The Mellops Go Flying, and his second, The Mellops Go Diving for Treasure. By the early 1960s, he had created at least 10 children's picture books with Harper, plus a few others, and had illustrated some books by other writers. In 1965, Ungerer designed owl print fabric for Stein-Tex, adapted from his book Various Owls. "I'd love to design clothes, but nobody has asked me," he said.

Ungerer also did illustration work for publications, including The New York Times, Esquire, Life, Harper's Bazaar, The Village Voice, and for television during the 1960s. He later began to create posters denouncing the Vietnam War.

Maurice Sendak called Moon Man (1966) "easily one of the best picture books in recent years." After Allumette: A Fable, subtitled With Due Respect to Hans Christian Andersen, the Grimm Brothers, and the Honorable Ambrose Bierce in 1974, Ungerer ceased writing children's books, focusing instead on adult-level books, many of which concern sexuality. He eventually returned to children's literature with Flix in 1998. Ungerer donated many of the manuscripts and artwork for his early children's books to the Children's Literature Research Collection at the Free Library of Philadelphia.

A consistent theme in Ungerer's illustrations was his support for European construction, beginning with Franco-German reconciliation in his home region of Alsace, and in particular European values of tolerance and diversity. In 2003, he was named Ambassador for Childhood and Education by the 47-nation Council of Europe.

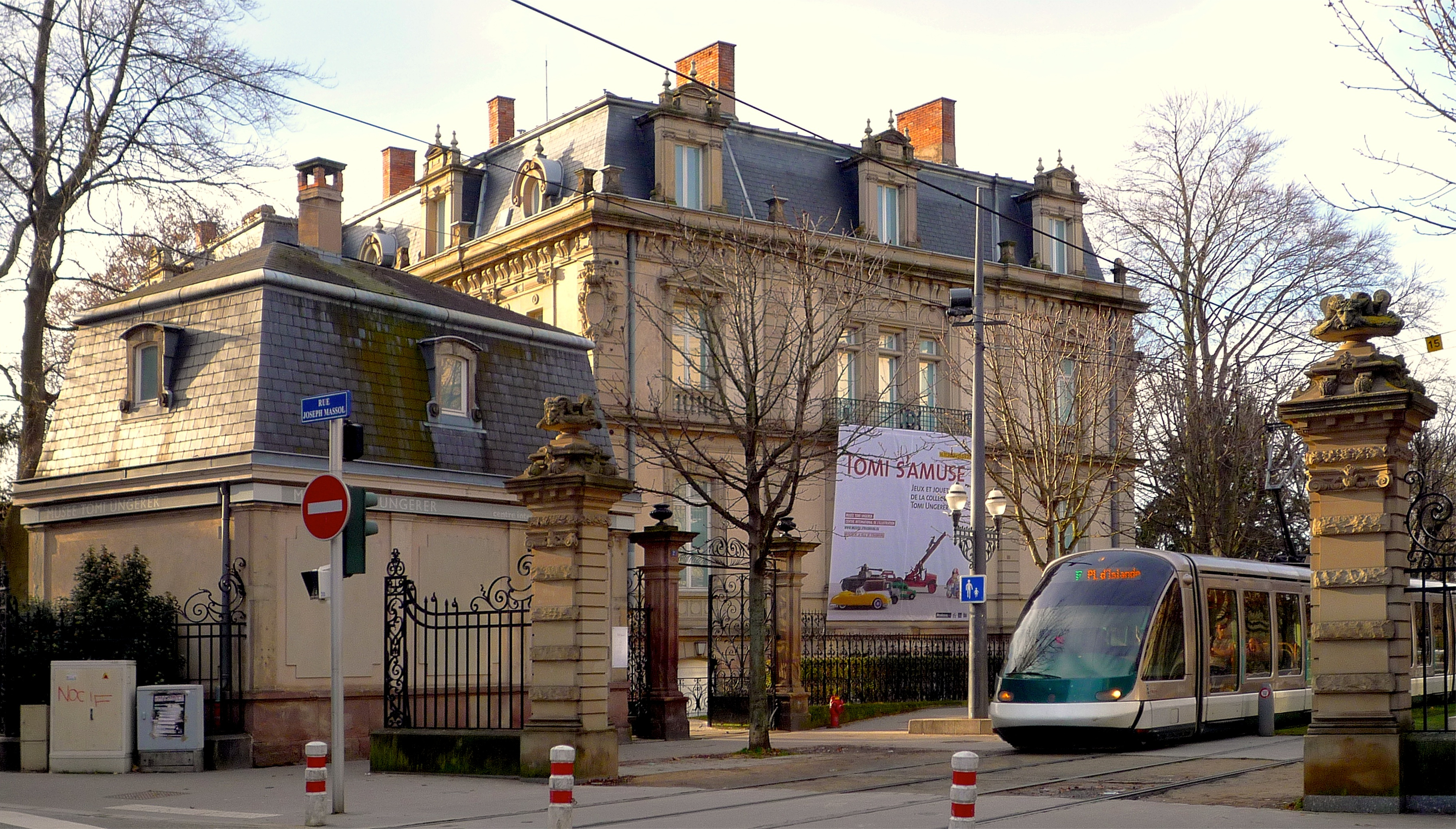
The Tomi Ungerer Museum in Strasbourg

In 2007, Ungerer's hometown dedicated a museum to him, the Musée Tomi Ungerer/Centre international de l’illustration.

Ungerer divided his time between Ireland, where he and his wife had moved in 1976, and Strasbourg. In addition to his work as a graphic artist and 'drawer', Ungerer was also a designer, toy collector and "archivist of human absurdity."

A biographical documentary film, Far Out Isn't Far Enough: The Tomi Ungerer Story, was produced in 2012. The film was featured at the 2013 Palm Springs International Film Festival. From 2015 to 2016, the Kunsthaus Zurich and the Museum Folkwang in Essen devoted a large exhibition to Ungerer's artistic oeuvre and in particular his collages. A comprehensive book has been published by Philipp Keel from Diogenes with essays by Tobias Burg, Cathérine Hug and Thérèse Willer.

Ungerer died on 9 February 2019 in Cork, Ireland; he was 87 years old.

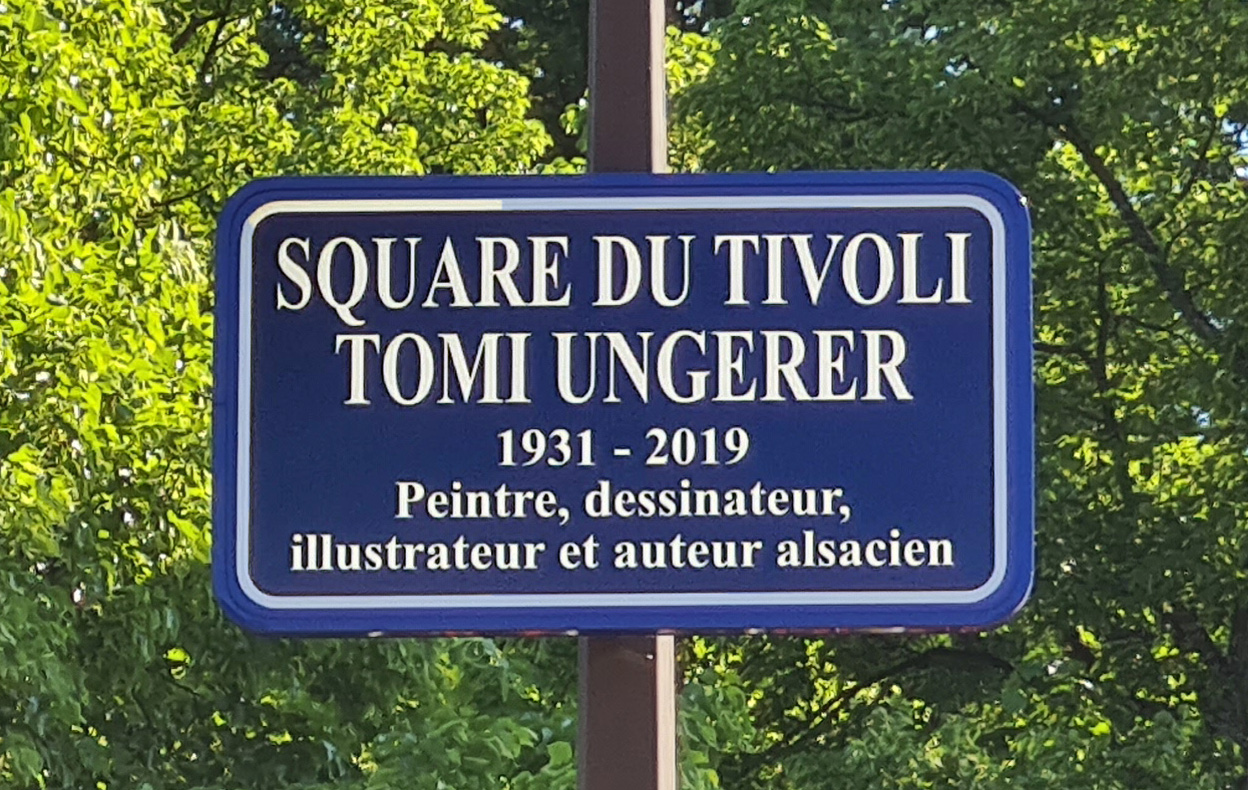

== Work ==
Ungerer described himself first and foremost as a storyteller and satirist. Prevalent themes in his work include political satire (such as drawings and posters against the Vietnam War and against animal cruelty), eroticism, and imaginative subjects for children's books. Ungerer's publications are held by the German National Library, including:

=== Children's books ===
- The Mellops Go Flying (1957)
- Mellops Go Diving for Treasure (1957)
- Crictor (1958)
- The Mellops Strike Oil (1958)
- Adelaide (1959)
- Christmas Eve at the Mellops (1960)
- Emile (1960)
- Rufus (1961)
- The Three Robbers (1961)
- Snail, Where Are You? (1962)
- Mellops Go Spelunking (1963)
- Flat Stanley (1964) — art by Tomi Ungerer, written by Jeff Brown
- One, Two, Where's My Shoe? (1964)
- Beastly Boys and Ghastly Girls (1964) — art by Tomi Ungerer, poems collected by William Cole
- Oh, What Nonsense! (1966) — art by Tomi Ungerer, edited by William Cole
- Orlando, the Brave Vulture (1966)
- Warwick's Three Bottles (1966) – with André Hodeir
- Moon Man (Der Mondmann) (Diogenes Verlag, 1966)
- Cleopatra Goes Sledding (1967) – with André Hodeir
- What's Good for a 4-Year-Old? (1967) — art by Tomi Ungerer, text by William Cole
- Zeralda's Ogre (1967)
- "The Donkey Ride" (1967) — art by Tomi Ungerer, fable adapted by Jean Showalter
- Ask Me a Question (1968)
- The Sorcerer's Apprentice (1969) — text by Barbara Hazen
- Oh, How Silly! (1970) — art by Tomi Ungerer, edited by William Cole
- The Hat (1970)
- I Am Papa Snap and These Are My Favorite No Such Stories (1971)
- The Beast of Monsieur Racine (1971)
- The Hut (1972)
- Oh, That's Ridiculous! (1972) — art by Tomi Ungerer, edited by William Cole
- No Kiss for Mother (1973)
- Allumette; A Fable, with Due Respect to Hans Christian Andersen, the Grimm Brothers, and the Honorable Ambrose Bierce (1974)
- A Storybook (1974) — art by Tomi Ungerer, collection of short stories adapted by various authors
- The Great Song Book — ed. by Timothy John (1978) English version of Das grosse Liederbuch, 1975
- Tomi Ungerer's Heidi: The Classic Novel (1997) — art by Tomi Ungerer, text by Johanna Spyri
- Cats as Cats Can (1997)
- Flix (1998)
- Tortoni Tremelo the Cursed Musician (1998)
- Otto: The Autobiography of a Teddy Bear (1999)
- Zloty (2009)
- Fog Island (2013)

=== Adult books ===
- Horrible. An account of the Sad Achievements of Progress
- Der Herzinfarkt (1962)
- The Underground Sketchbook (1964)
- The Party (1966)
- Fornicon (1969)
- Tomi Ungerer's Compromises (1970)
- Poster Art of Tomi Ungerer (1972)
- America (1974)
- Totempole (1976)
- Babylon (1979)
- Cat-Hater's Handbook, Or, The Ailurophobe's Delight (1981) — co-authored by William Cole
- Symptomatics (1982)
- Rigor Mortis (1983)
- Slow Agony (1983)
- Heute hier, morgen fort (1983)
- Far out Isn't Far Enough (1984)
- Femme Fatale (1984)
- Schwarzbuch (1984)
- Joy of Frogs (1985)
- Warteraum (1985)
- Schutzengel der Hölle (1986)
- Cats As Cats Can (1997)
- Tomi: A Childhood Under the Nazis (1998)
- Liberal Arts: The Political Art of Tomi Ungerer (1999)
- Erotoscope (2002)
- De père en fils (2002)

=== Other works ===
- Design of Dr. Strangelove film poster (1964)
- Design of the logo for the ill-fated Broadway musical Kelly (1965)
- Art work, poster, and titles for the film Monterey Pop (1968)
- Design of the Janus Aqueduct in Strasbourg (1988)

== Awards ==
The biennial Hans Christian Andersen Award conferred by the International Board on Books for Young People is the highest recognition available to a writer or illustrator of children's books. Ungerer received the illustration award in 1998.

Ungerer received the 2014 Lifetime Achievement of the Year award at the Sexual Freedom Awards. In 2018, he was made a commander of the Legion of Honour.

In 2007, a museum dedicated to Ungerer's life and work opened in Strasbourg.

== Literature ==
- Wilhelm Hornbostel (ed.): Tomi Ungerer. Zwischen Marianne und Germania, on the occasion of the exhibitions of the same name at the Museum für Kunst und Gewerbe Hamburg, 19 December 1999 – 13 February 2000, and at the Deutsches Historisches Museum, Berlin, 16 March – 13 June 2000]. Prestel, Munich 1999
- Maria Linsmann: preface to exhibition catalogue Tomi Ungerer-Illustrationen und Plastiken, Burg Wissem, Bilderbuchmuseum of Troisdorf 2000
- Thérèse Willer: Tomi Ungerer, the "Picasso“ of caricature. In: Graphis. The international journal of design and communication, ISSN 0017-3452, vol. 59, no. 348, 2003, pp 18–37
- Thérèse Willer: Tomi Ungerer. Das Tomi Ungerer Museum in Strasbourg. Diogenes, Zurich 2007, ISBN 978-3-257-02094-6. (catalogue of the permanent exhibition, with 210 illustrations by Ungerer, three essays by Thérèse Willer and several introductions)
- Thérèse Willer: Tomi Ungerer: Energie. EnBW Service, Karlsruhe 2007, ISBN 978-3-934510-26-5.
- Tomi Ungerer. Der schärfste Strich der westlichen Welt. du Kulturmedien, No. 812, Zurich 2010, ISBN 978-3-905931-04-4, Table of contents
- Daniel Keel (ed.): Expect the Unexpected. Essays über Tomi Ungerer zu seinem 80. Geburtstag, essays by Manuel Gasser, Walther Killy, Friedrich Dürrenmatt, Robert Gernhardt, Anna Gavalda, Elke Heidenreich. Diogenes, Zurich 2011, ISBN 978-3-257-05614-3
