= Gnome Reserve =

Former garden and tourist attraction in England

Coordinates: 50.915866°N 4.343961°W

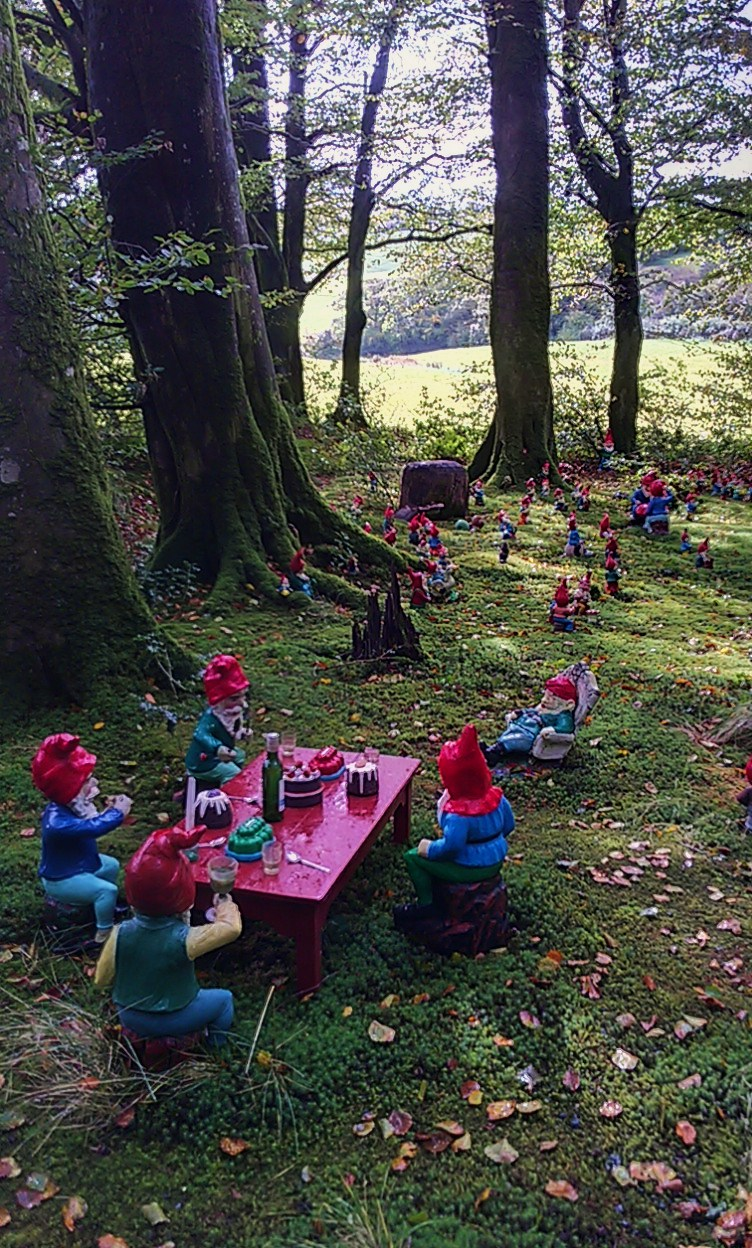
The Gnome Reserve

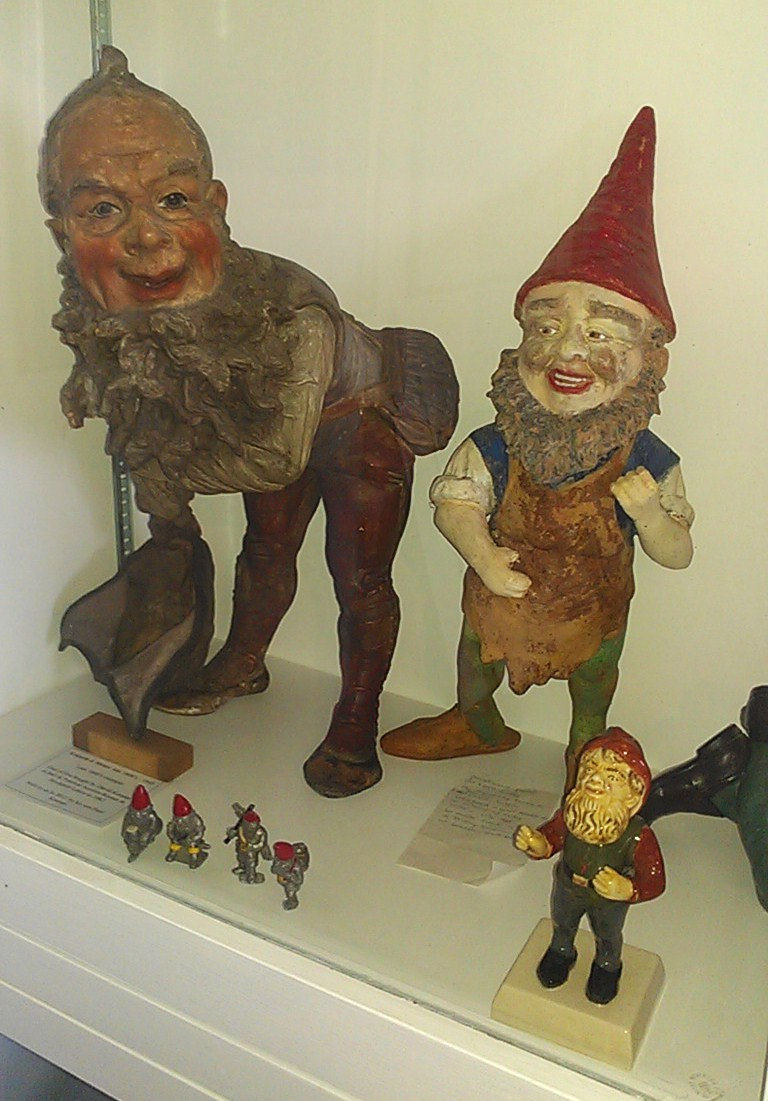
Historic garden gnomes on display at the Reserve

The Gnome Reserve is a garden and tourist attraction in West Putford, near Bradworthy, Devon, England, presented as a pastoral refuge for garden gnomes.

The reserve was established in 1979 by Ann Atkin, a former art student. Her account states,

While painting birds in landscapes I came to what was like a T Junction in my painting development. I did not know whether to turn left or right as different elements of what I liked in painting appeared irreconcilably in opposite directions. It was very disturbing! Until—one day—a gnome appeared in my mind and seemed to say: "Don’t go left; don’t go right; you must dig / build your own road straight across."

Ann Atkin established the reserve on 4 acres (1.6 ha) and remains the owner today. Gnome merchandise is sold to visiting tourists. The reserve holds more than 2,000 gnomes and is included in the Guinness Book of World Records. The four-acre reserve also has model pixies. The area includes woodlands, a stream, pond, meadow, and wildflower garden with "about 250 labelled species of wildflowers, herbs, grasses and ferns." Photographs are allowed and encouraged. Gnome hats and fishing rods are loaned to visitors free of charge. It is not uncommon for some gnomes to eventually get taken by the visitors. The reserve has refused to sell gnomes with knives on their backs.

As of 2026, the website reports the grounds to have been sold for private housing, and the collection moved to a nearby gardening shop.

== See also ==
- Watermouth Castle, also in North Devon, which is home to Gnome Land, a gnome-themed amusement park.
