= Travelling gnome =

Garden gnome taken on a trip

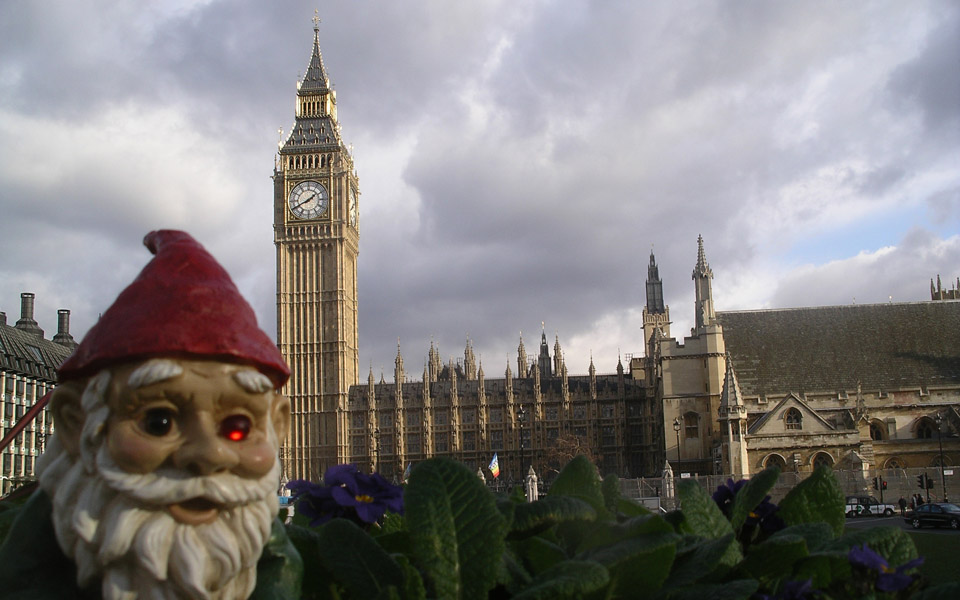
A travelling gnome with London's Big Ben in the background

The travelling gnome or roaming gnome is a garden gnome lawn ornament brought on a trip and photographed in front of famous landmarks. The practice is called gnoming. Some instances have become national and international news stories, where people have stolen a garden gnome from a garden, and then sent the owner photos of the gnome for a period of time as a practical joke, before returning it.

The Garden Gnomes Liberation Front that was created in France was a community that considered gnoming to be stealing garden gnomes from other people's property, without the intention of returning them, as part of their purported mission to "free" gnomes and "return them to the wild", which has sometimes led to criminal charges, jail time, or fines.

== Origins ==
The concept of the travelling gnome dates back to the 1970s when Henry Sunderland photographed his own garden gnomes, which he named Harry and Charlie, while he was travelling around Antarctica.

The earliest record of a prank involving a travelling gnome is from Australia in 1986 when the Sydney Morning Herald reported that an "Eastern Suburbs gnome-owner was distressed when she discovered her gnome had been stolen at the weekend. A note was found in its place: 'Dear mum, couldn't stand the solitude any longer. Gone off to see the world. Don't be worried, I'll be back soon. Love Bilbo xxx.'". A similar, earlier kidnapping incident occurred in Stamford, Lincolnshire, England

== Travelling gnome prank ==
A running prank has developed, which has made national news at times, where people steal a garden gnome from an unknowing person's lawn and then send the owner photos of the gnome and sometimes cryptic messages that were supposedly written by the gnome for a time as a practical joke before returning it.

In 2005 a group of American college students stole a garden gnome, dubbed "Gnome Severson" in the media, from a property in Redmond, Washington, and took it on a roadtrip to California and Nevada. Gnome Severson became a national news story after the group ran into socialite Paris Hilton at a gas station, who posed for a picture with the gnome that was printed in People magazine. At the end of the week-long trip, the group anonymously returned the gnome to its owner's front porch with a photo album titled "Gnome’s Spring Break 2005", which included the issue of People and other pictures of the gnome around Hollywood, San Francisco, and Las Vegas. The owner, who had not even noticed the gnome was missing until she found it returned on her porch, was interviewed on Good Morning America.

According to ABC News, the owner decided to auction the gnome on eBay, which sold with the photo album for US$360 in May 2005, because she became tired of all of the media attention. However, in February 2006, it was reported that the gnome had actually been secretly purchased on eBay by the owner's friends who continued to take photos of it around the world in locations such as Canada, Mexico, Italy, and Thailand. After it was returned for the second time, the original owner, referring to it as "the prodigal gnome", said she had decided to keep it and would not sell it on eBay again.

In 2016, an ASDA Gnome named Gnorman was stolen from its owner in Luton, England. The perpetrator sent him a letter stating "Goodbyes are not forever, Goodbyes are not the end, They simply mean I‘ll miss you, Until we meet again.", and then continued to taunt him by making a Facebook profile in the Gnome's name then followed by posting pictures of it in many locations, such as the cinema, pubs, a trampoline park, a bowling alley, and an arcade.

== Gnoming as theft ==
There have also been a number of criminal incidents in which individuals or groups steal large numbers of garden gnomes without the intention of returning, often with the purported mission of "freeing" gnomes and "returning them to the wild". These crimes can cause distress to the victims of the theft, particularly if the gnomes have sentimental value.

France's Garden Gnome Liberation Front was formed in 1997 in Alençon, France, aiming to release garden gnomes in their "natural habitat", for instance forests. In 2006 they claimed 165 active groups in France, Canada, Germany, Spain, and the United States, and became known to the public in the 1990s when they took credit for the theft of hundreds of garden gnomes around France. In 1997, their ringleader was sent to prison and fined for stealing over 150 garden gnomes over a period of several years.

In 1998, the Garden Gnome Liberation Front made headlines again when they staged a "mass suicide" of gnomes by hanging 11 garden gnomes with nooses around their necks under a bridge at Briey in northeastern France with a note that stated, "When you read these few words we will no longer be part of your selfish world, where we serve merely as pretty decorations." The Front was in the news again in 2000 when they stole 20 gnomes overnight from a garden exhibition in Paris, and they were suspected in 2006, when 80 gnomes were stolen in the central Limousin region of France under a banner that said "gnome mistreated, gnome liberated".

In 2008, a 53-year-old man, who law-enforcement officials believed acted alone, was arrested on suspicion of stealing as many as 170 garden gnomes in the Brittany region of France.

In 2018, Louisville Metro Police Department arrested Barton E. Bishop (commonly known as "Gnome bandit"), a Highlands, Georgia thief who was responsible for stealing garden gnomes among other valuables from people's porches.

== In popular culture ==
The travelling-gnome prank was a subplot on the British soap Coronation Street in May 1995, when the Wiltons first noticed their gnome missing (episode 3853) and then received a postcard from Eastbourne; purportedly sent by that gnome (episode 3855). The prank was further popularized by the film Amélie (2001) in which the main character persuaded her father to follow his dream of touring the world by stealing his garden gnome and having an air-hostess friend send pictures of it from all over the world. The travelling gnome theme later became the basis for Travelocity's "Where is my Gnome?" advertising campaign.

The short, fantasy story "The Garden Gnome Freedom Front" (2005) by Laura Frankos, published in The Enchanter Completed: A Tribute Anthology for L. Sprague de Camp, deals with the supernatural aspect of this custom.

The travelling gnome has appeared in several video games. For example, it has been used as a recurring Easter egg in The Sims computer game series, such as SimCity 3000 (1999) and The Sims 3 (2009) where different varieties of garden gnomes appear and move or change position daily and in SimCity 4 (2004), in which gnomes reveal themselves in the game's buildable landmarks. In The Sims 4: Seasons, the garden gnomes are randomly spawned during various holidays with the player's task is to appease them with various stuff, including coffee, fruitcake pie, salad, toy or future cube. In the video game Half-Life 2: Episode Two (2007), players receive a special achievement award for launching a garden gnome into outer space in a rocket after carrying it throughout most of the game. In November 2020, a replica of the garden gnome from Half-Life 2: Episode Two was launched into low Earth orbit on board a Rocket Lab Electron rocket. Gnonstop Gnomes, a mobile app for Android and iOS devices, lets users attach clipart of virtual gnomes to their travel photographs that they can share with friends.

== See also ==
- Gnome Reserve
- List of practical joke topics
- The Flat Stanley Project – a similar project where a physical object is photographed in various locales
- Wastwater
