= Traffic signal preemption =

Traffic light override system

Traffic signal preemption (also called traffic signal prioritisation) is a system that allows an operator to override the normal operation of traffic lights. The most common use of these systems manipulates traffic signals in the path of an emergency vehicle, halting conflicting traffic and allowing the emergency vehicle right-of-way, thereby reducing response times and enhancing traffic safety. Signal preemption can also be used on tram, light-rail and bus rapid transit systems, to allow public transportation priority access through intersections, and by railroad systems at crossings to prevent collisions.

== Implementation ==
Traffic preemption is implemented in a variety of ways. Traffic light activation devices can be installed on road vehicles, integrated with transport network management systems, or operated by remote control from a fixed location, such as a fire station, or by an emergency call dispatcher. Traffic lights are equipped to receive an activation signal which interrupts the normal cycle. Traffic signals not equipped to receive a traffic preemption signal will not recognize an activation, and will continue to operate on the normal cycle.

Vehicular devices can be switched on or off as needed, but in the case of emergency vehicles, they are frequently integrated with the vehicle's emergency warning lights. When activated, the traffic preemption device will cause appropriately equipped traffic lights in the path of the vehicle to cycle immediately, granting right-of-way in the desired direction, after allowing programmed time delays for the necessary signal changes and for pedestrian crosswalks to clear.

Traffic signal preemption systems integrated with train transportation networks typically extend their control of traffic from the typical crossarms and warning lights to one or more nearby traffic intersections, to prevent excessive road traffic from approaching the crossing, while also obtaining the right-of-way for road traffic to quickly clear the crossing. That also allows buses and vehicles transporting dangerous goods to proceed through the intersection without stopping on the railroad tracks.

Fixed-location systems can vary widely, but a typical implementation is for a single traffic signal in front of or near a fire station to stop traffic and allow emergency vehicles to exit the station unimpeded. Alternatively, an entire corridor of traffic signals along a street may be operated from a fixed location, such as to allow fire apparatus to quickly respond through a crowded downtown area, or to allow an ambulance faster access when transporting a critical patient to a hospital in an area with dense traffic.

Traffic signal preemption systems sometimes include a method for communicating to the operator of the vehicle that requested the preemption (as well as other drivers) that a traffic signal is under control of a preemption device, by means of a notifier. This device is commonly referred to in the industry as a "confirmation beacon". It is usually an additional light located near the traffic signals. It may be a single LED light bulb visible to all, which flashes or stays on, or there may be a light aimed towards each direction from which traffic approaches the intersection. In the case of multiple notifier lights at a controllable intersection, they will either flash or stay on depending on the local configuration, to communicate to all drivers from which direction a preempting signal is being received. This informs regular drivers which direction may need to be cleared, and informs activating vehicle drivers if they have control of the light (especially important when more than one activating vehicle approaches the same intersection). A typical installation would provide a solid notifier to indicate that an activating vehicle is approaching from behind, while a flashing notifier would indicate the emergency vehicle is approaching laterally or oncoming. There are variations of notification methods in use, which may include one or more colored lights in varying configurations. Some of the newer high tech systems have a display in the cab, which will eliminate the necessity of a confirmation beacon. This can also reduce the cost of a preemption project considerably.

Events leading up to an activation and notification are not experienced by drivers on a daily basis, and driver education and awareness of these systems can play a role in how effective the systems are in speeding response times. Unusual circumstances can also occur which can confuse operators of vehicles with traffic preemption equipment who lack proper training. For example, on January 2, 2005, a fire engine successfully preempted a traffic light at an intersection which included a light rail train (LRT) crossing in Hillsboro, Oregon, yet the fire engine was hit by an LRT at the crossing. A subsequent inquiry determined that the LRT operator was at fault. The accident occurred in the middle of a network of closely spaced signalized intersections where the signs and signals granted right-of-way to the LRT simultaneously, at ALL intersections. The LRT operator was viewing right-of-way indications from downstream signals and failed to realize that preemption had occurred at the nearest intersection. The fire engine, granted the green light before it arrived at the intersection, proceeded through while the LRT operator, failing to notice the unexpected signal to stop, ran into the fire engine and destroyed it.

== Vehicular device types ==
=== Acoustic ===
Some systems use an acoustic sensor linked to the preemption system. This can be used alone or in conjunction with other systems. Systems of this type override the traffic signal when a specific pattern of tweets or wails from the siren of an emergency vehicle is detected. Advantages of a system like this are that they are fairly inexpensive to integrate into existing traffic signals and the ability to use siren equipment already installed in emergency vehicles – thus dispensing with the need for special equipment. A major disadvantage is that sound waves can easily be reflected by buildings or other large vehicles present at or near an intersection, causing the "reflected" wave to trigger a preemption event in the wrong direction. Reflected waves can also create unnecessary collateral preemption events alongside streets near the emergency vehicle's route. Yet another disadvantage is that the acoustic sensors can sometimes be sensitive enough to activate the preemption in response to a siren from too far away, or from an unauthorized vehicle with a horn exceeding 120 dB (many truck and bus horns exceed this threshold ‘at close range’).

=== Line-of-sight ===
In the US, a flashing white light on top of a traffic signal usually indicates that an emergency vehicle is using a system to preempt the light, causing it to cycle to green for the emergency vehicle's direction of travel. A proposed future fourth, white light on the main signal is also being researched to coordinate autonomous vehicles, signaling human drivers to follow the lead autonomous vehicle to improve traffic flow. A vehicle that uses a line-of-sight traffic signal preemption system is equipped with an emitter which typically sends a narrowly directed signal forward, towards traffic lights in front of the vehicle, in an attempt to obtain right-of-way through a controllable intersection prior to arrival. These line-of-sight systems will generally use an invisible infrared signal, or a visible strobe light as an emitter. In the case of a strobe light, it may also serve a dual purpose as an additional warning light. To communicate to the traffic light, the emitter transmits visible flashes of light or invisible infrared pulses at a specified frequency. Traffic lights must be equipped with a compatible traffic signal preemption receiver to respond. Once the vehicle with the active emitter has passed the intersection, the receiving device no longer senses the emitter's signal, and normal operation resumes. Some systems can be implemented with varying frequencies assigned to specific types of uses, which would then allow an intersection's preemption equipment to differentiate between a fire engine and a bus sending a signal simultaneously, and then grant priority access first to the fire engine.

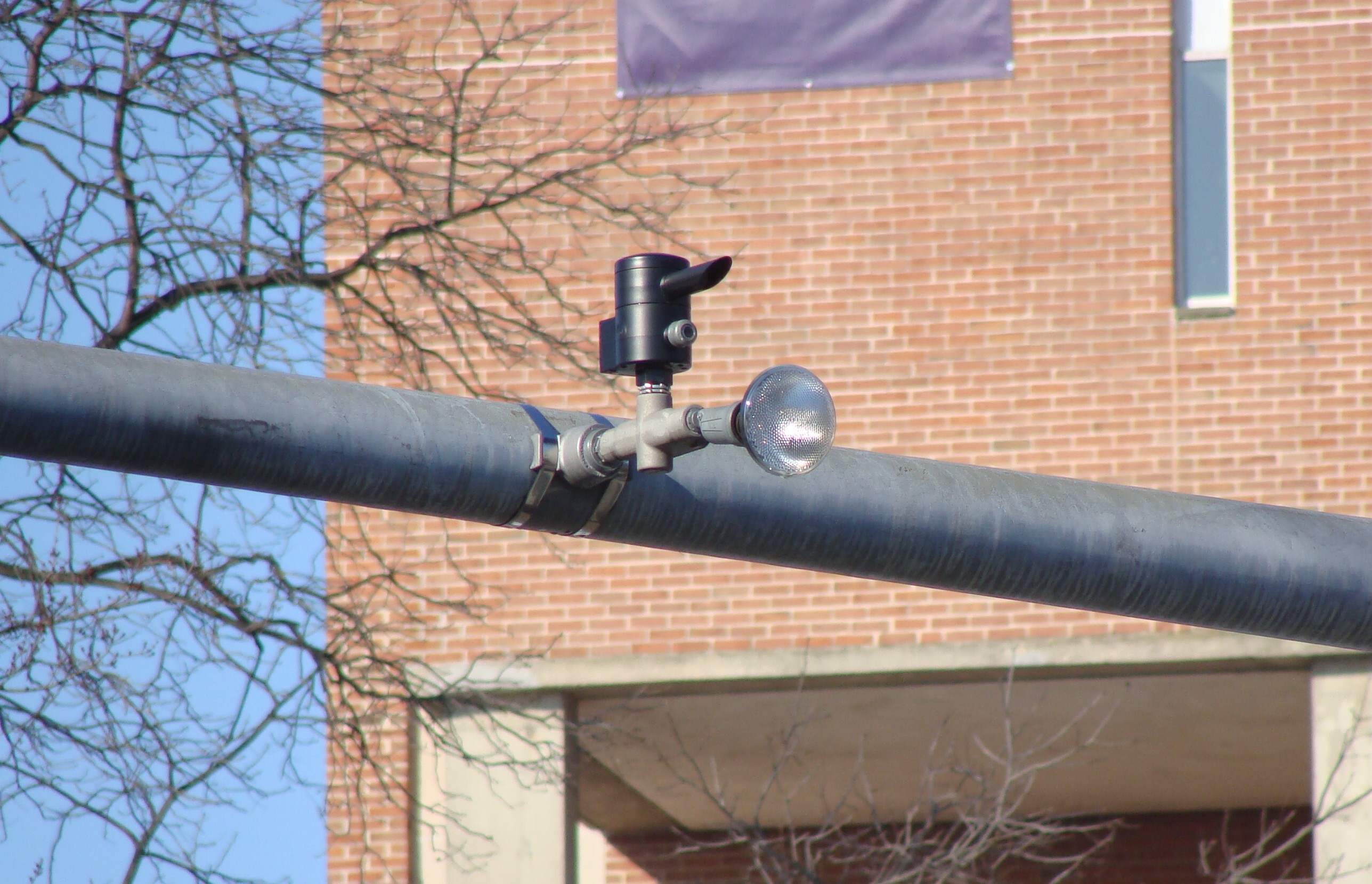
A notifier and receiver mounted between traffic lights.

Drawbacks of line-of-sight systems include obstructions, lighting and environmental conditions, and undesired activations. Obstructions may be buildings on a curving road that block visual contact with a traffic signal until very close, or perhaps a large freight truck. In the case of a police car, such a blockage would serve to prevent the traffic signal from receiving the police car's emitter signal. Modifying the position of the receiver or even locating it separate from the traffic signal equipment can sometimes correct this problem. Direct sunlight into a receiver may prevent it from detecting an emitter, and severe environmental conditions, such as heavy rain or snow, may reduce the distance at which a line-of-sight system will function. Undesired activations may occur if an emitter's signal is picked up by many traffic lights along a stretch of road, all directed to change to red in that direction, prior to the activating vehicle turning off the road, or being parked without its emitter being deactivated.

Line of sight emitters can use IR diodes. They are pulsed with a low-priority signal (10 Hz) or a high-priority signal (14 Hz).

=== Localized radio signal ===
Radio-based traffic-preemption systems using a local, short-range radio signal in the 900MHz band, can usually avoid the weaknesses of line-of-sight systems (2.4 GHz and optical). A radio-based system still uses a directional signal transmitted from an emitter, but being radio-based, its signal is not blocked by visual obstructions, lighting or weather conditions. Until recently, the major drawback of radio-based traffic signal preemption systems was the possibility of interference from other devices that may be using the same frequency at a given time and location. The advent of FHSS (Frequency Hopping Spread Spectrum) broadcasting has allowed radio-based systems to not only overcome this limitation, but also the aforementioned limitations associated with acoustic and line of sight (optical) systems. It was not until recently that cost effective GPS preemption systems were introduced, supplanting FHSS radio-based preemption as the preemption method of choice, particularly for cities that had experienced the myriad of issues associated with other (acoustic and optical) preemption systems.

Radio-based systems also began to offer some additional benefits — adjustable range and collision avoidance. The operating range was adjusted by varying the radio signal strength so that traffic lights could be activated only nearby (if desired), or at greater distances. The downside to these preemption systems (which also performed collision avoidance) was that they would display the direction of impending collisions, but not be able to effectively (or accurately) calculate the distance to collision by any method other than RF signal strength, which was only a rough estimate at best.

=== Global Positioning System ===
With the advent of widespread Global Positioning System (GPS) applications came the introduction of a GPS-based traffic preemption system capable of collision avoidance. Recently some GPS preemption systems have found a way to overcome the nagging problem that "blinds" many GPS systems: how to prevent the system from being "blinded" by the loss of a GPS signal. In dense cities with tall buildings, GPS receivers may have difficulty obtaining the four required GPS satellite signals, required for trilateration to determine location. If the vehicle systems are not designed with a backup "IMU" (Inertial Measurement Unit), lack of GPS availability may adversely affect the system's performance. Extremely heavy cloud cover or severe weather can also adversely impact the ability of the GPS receiver from obtaining the four required satellites.

Some systems offer an Optical Compatible GPS system with features that also include an Inertial measurement unit (IMU). The price point of some compare to Optical Systems. Therefore, cities that do not have preemption can get a GPS based system for the price of Optical Systems (typically 1/3 the price of many GPS systems). Additionally, cities that have existing optical systems can start upgrading to a GPS-based system while maintaining compatibility with their existing Optical vehicle emitters. These systems also come with Collision Avoidance.

GPS systems typically convey their information in one of three ways - via 900 MHz FHSS, via 2.4 GHz FHSS, or by way of cellular modem. Each of these methodologies has a different set of advantages/disadvantages. 900 MHz FHSS appears to be the best option, because it is capable of the greatest range (often over 4.8 km or 3 mi for a 1 watt transceiver). 2.4 GHz is able to communicate more data, but is typically considered more "directional" or "line-of-sight". It only has a maximum range of about 1.2 km (3/4 mi). This can often preclude the system from preempting soon enough to ensure a clear intersection upon arrival. Cellular overcomes the "distance" issue, but can be quite costly when cellular fees are taken into consideration. During an area-wide emergency, it is also well known to those in the industry that the cellular network often will go down. This can make preemption difficult (unless there are other backup systems in place) during a time (of crisis) when preemption may be needed most. Cellular also brings with it a certain amount of "latency". It has been documented that it can sometimes take cellular based preemption systems 10 seconds or more to release the preemption of a traffic signal, even though the emergency vehicle has already cleared the intersection.

== See also ==
- Bus priority
- Bus rapid transit creep
- Mobile Infrared Transmitter
