= Traffic =

Movement of vehicles and pedestrians along land routes

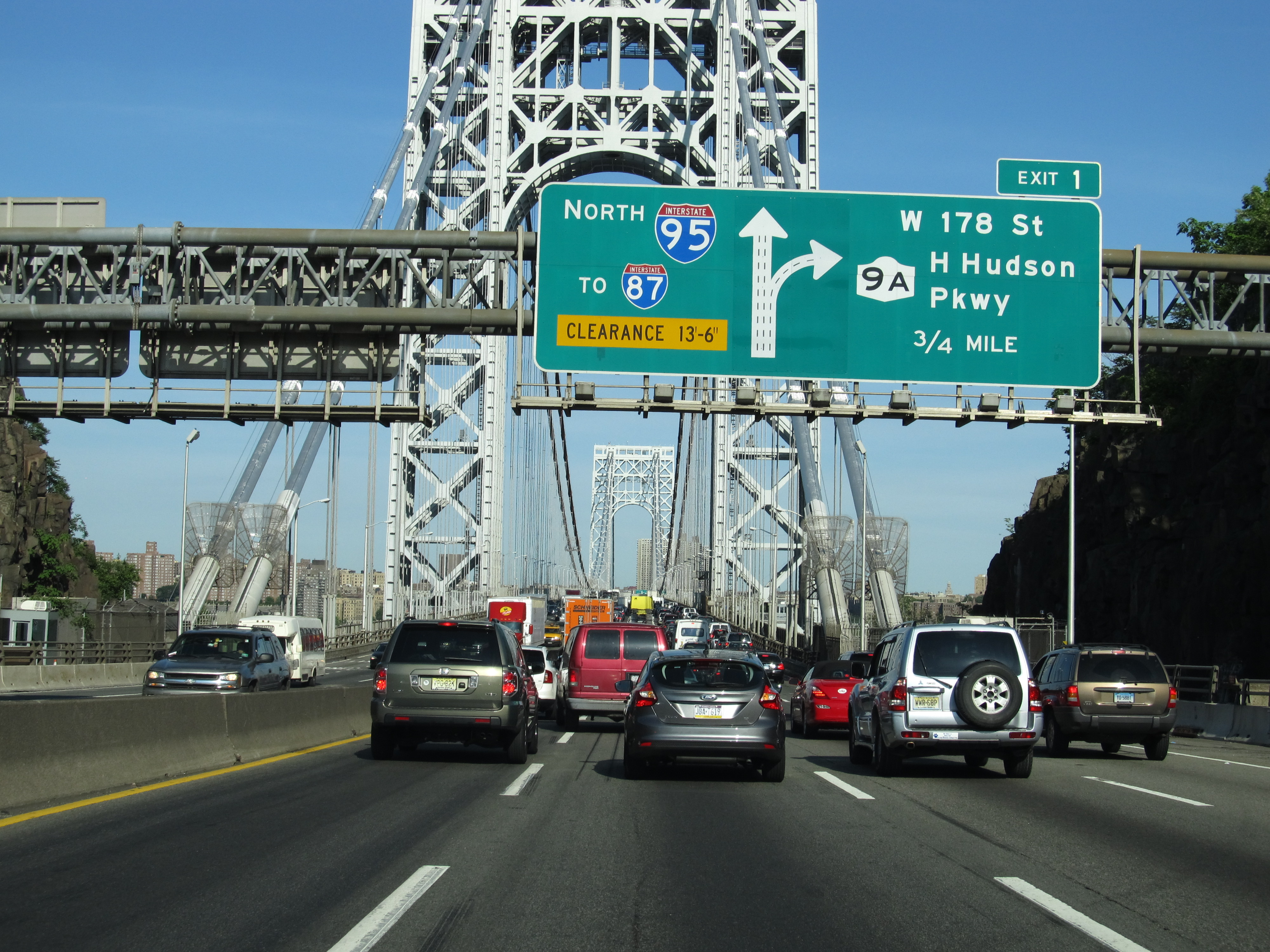
Crossing from Fort Lee, Bergen County, New Jersey, into Manhattan, New York in heavy automobile traffic on the George Washington Bridge, the world's busiest motor vehicle bridge, transporting approximately 300,000 cars and trucks daily across the Hudson River.

Traffic is the movement of vehicles and pedestrians along land routes.

Traffic laws govern and regulate traffic, while rules of the road include traffic laws and informal rules that may have developed over time to facilitate the orderly and timely flow of traffic. Organized traffic generally has well-established priorities, lanes, right-of-way, and traffic control at intersections. (International Regulations for Preventing Collisions at Sea govern the oceans and influence some laws for navigating domestic waters.)

Traffic is formally organized in many jurisdictions, with marked lanes, junctions, intersections, interchanges, traffic signals, cones, or signs. Traffic is often classified by type: heavy motor vehicle (e.g., car, truck), other vehicle (e.g., moped, bicycle), and pedestrian. Different classes may share speed limits and easement, or may be segregated. Some jurisdictions may have very detailed and complex rules of the road while others rely more on drivers' common sense and willingness to cooperate.

Organization typically produces a better combination of travel safety and efficiency. Events which disrupt the flow and may cause traffic to degenerate into a disorganized mess include road construction, collisions, and debris in the roadway. On particularly busy freeways, a minor disruption may persist in a phenomenon known as traffic waves. A complete breakdown of organization may result in traffic congestion and gridlock. Simulations of organized traffic frequently involve queuing theory, stochastic processes and equations of mathematical physics applied to traffic flow.

== Etymology and types ==
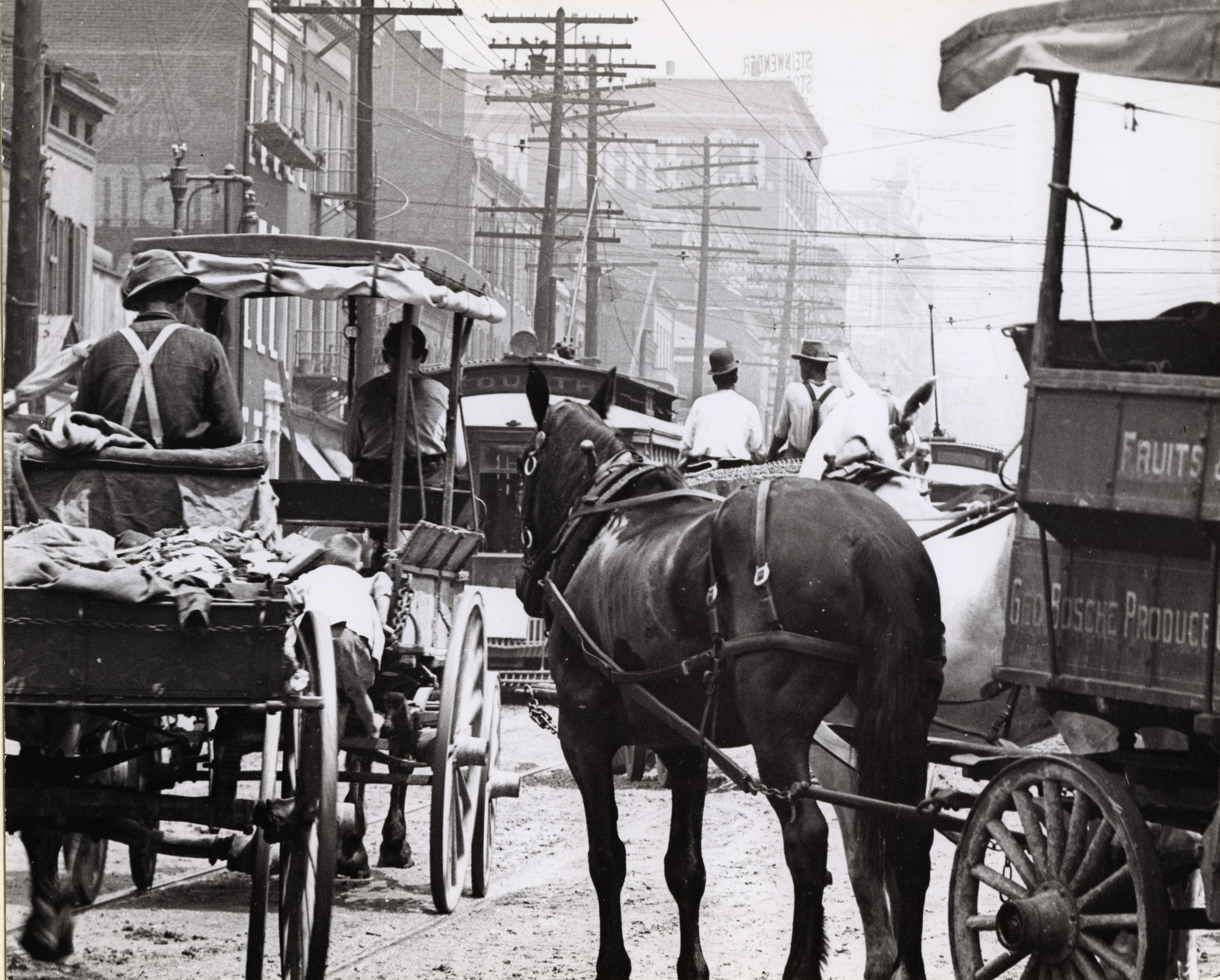
Congestion in St. Louis, Missouri, early 20th century

The word traffic originally meant "trade" (as it still does) and comes from the Old Italian verb trafficare and noun traffico, as well as the Middle French trafique. The origin of the Italian words is unclear. Suggestions include Catalan trafegar "decant", an assumed Vulgar Latin verb transfricare 'rub across', an assumed Vulgar Latin combination of trans- and facere 'make or do', Arabic tafriq 'distribution', and Arabic taraffaqa, which can mean 'seek profit'. Broadly, the term covers many kinds of traffic including network traffic, air traffic, marine traffic and rail traffic, but it is often used narrowly to mean only road traffic.

== Rules of the road ==
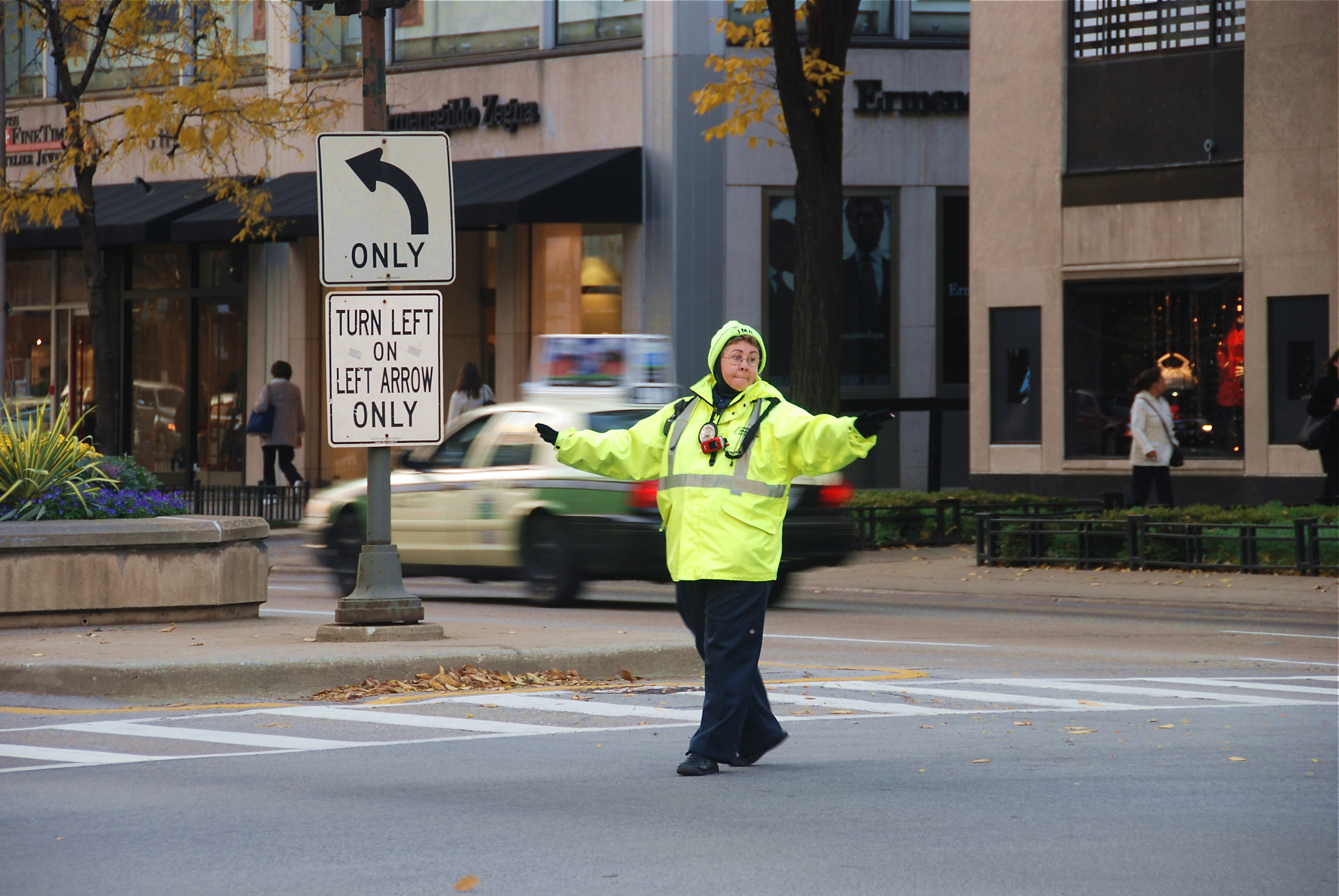
Traffic controller on Michigan Avenue in Chicago, Illinois

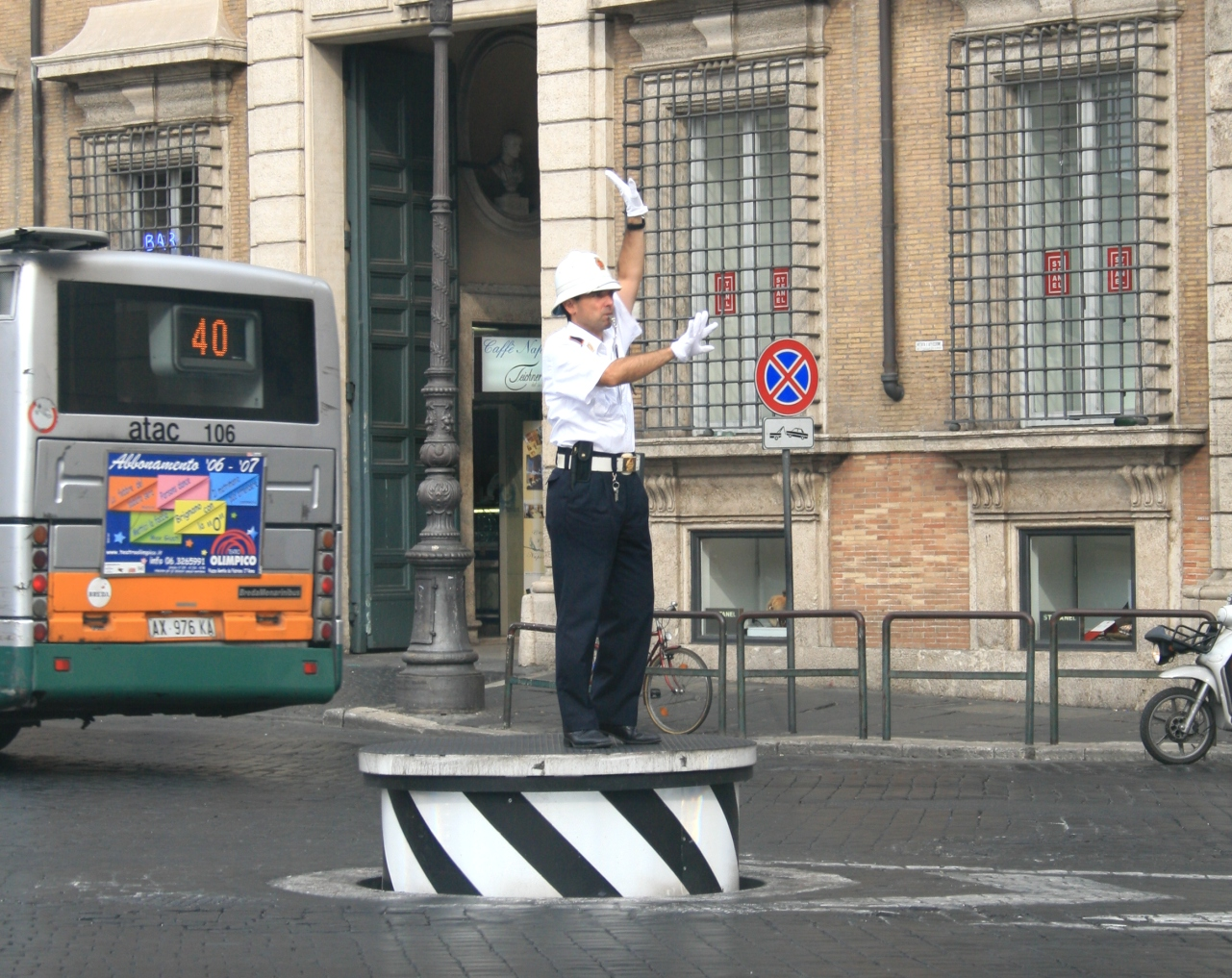
Traffic control in Rome, Italy. This traffic control podium can retract back to road level when not in use.

Rules of the road and driving etiquette are the general practices and procedures that road users are required to follow. These rules usually apply to all road users, though they are of special importance to motorists and cyclists. These rules govern interactions between vehicles and pedestrians. The basic traffic rules are defined by an international treaty under the authority of the United Nations, the 1968 Vienna Convention on Road Traffic. Not all countries are signatory to the convention and, even among signatories, local variations in practice may be found. There are also unwritten local rules of the road, which are generally understood by local drivers.

As a general rule, drivers are expected to avoid a collision with another vehicle and pedestrians, regardless of whether or not the applicable rules of the road allow them to be where they happen to be.

In addition to the rules applicable by default, traffic signs and traffic lights must be obeyed, and instructions may be given by a police officer, either routinely (on a busy crossing instead of traffic lights) or as road traffic control around a construction zone, accident, or other road disruption.

=== Directionality ===
Traffic heading in inverse ways ought to be isolated so as to not hinder each other's way. The most essential guideline is whether to utilize the left or right half of the street.

=== Traffic regulations ===
In many countries, the rules of the road are codified, setting out the legal requirements and punishments for breaking them.

In the United Kingdom, the rules are set out in the Highway Code, which includes not only obligations but also advice on how to drive sensibly and safely.

In the United States, traffic laws are regulated by the states and municipalities through their respective traffic codes. Most of these are based at least in part on the Uniform Vehicle Code, but there are variations from state to state. In states such as Florida, traffic law and criminal law are separate; therefore, unless someone flees the scene of an accident or commits vehicular homicide or manslaughter, they are only guilty of a minor traffic offense. However, states such as South Carolina have completely criminalised their traffic law, so, for example, one is guilty of a misdemeanor simply for travelling 5 miles over the speed limit.

=== Trail ethics (right of way) ===
Trail ethics are a set of informal rules for right of way for users of trails, including hikers, mountaineers, equestrians, cyclists, and mountain bikers.

== Organised traffic ==
=== Passage priority (right of way) ===
Vehicles often come into conflict with other vehicles and pedestrians because their intended courses of travel intersect, and thus interfere with each other's routes. The general principle that establishes who has the right to go first is called "right of way" or "priority". It establishes who has the right to use the conflicting part of the road and who has to wait until the other does so.

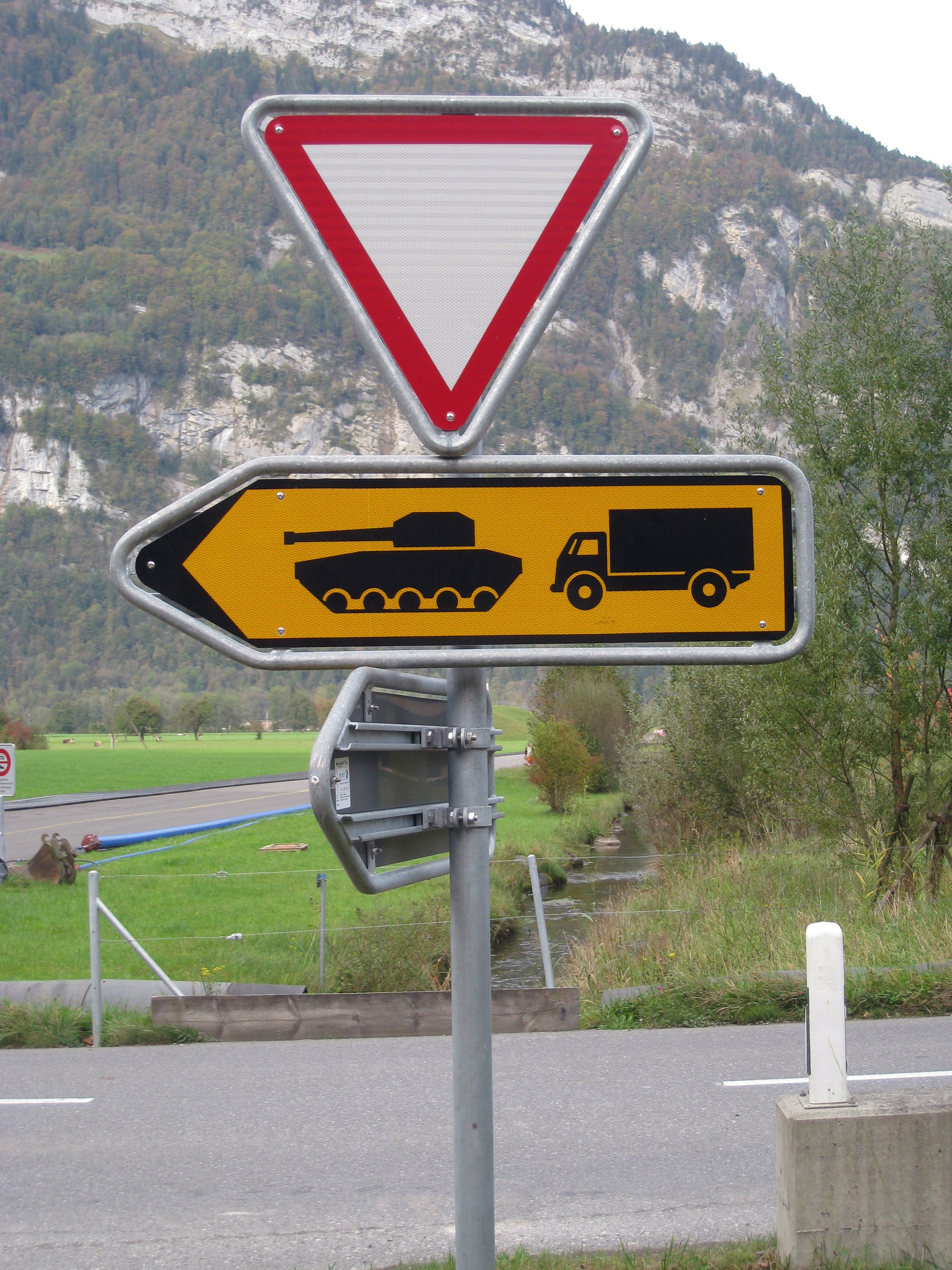
Yield sign in Switzerland. Mandatory direction to military traffic.

Signs, signals, markings and other features are often used to make priority explicit. Some signs, such as the stop sign, are nearly universal. When there are no signs or markings, different rules are observed depending on the location. These default priority rules differ between countries, and may even vary within countries. Trends toward uniformity are exemplified at an international level by the Vienna Convention on Road Signs and Signals, which prescribes standardised traffic control devices (signs, signals, and markings) for establishing the right of way where necessary.

Crosswalks (or pedestrian crossings) are common in populated areas, and may indicate that pedestrians have priority over vehicular traffic. In most modern cities, the traffic signal is used to establish the right of way on the busy roads. Its primary purpose is to give each road a duration of time in which its traffic may use the intersection in an organised way. The intervals of time assigned for each road may be adjusted to take into account factors such as difference in volume of traffic, the needs of pedestrians, or other traffic signals. Pedestrian crossings may be located near other traffic control devices; if they are not also regulated in some way, vehicles must give priority to them when in use. Traffic on a public road usually has priority over other traffic such as traffic emerging from private access; rail crossings and drawbridges are typical exceptions.

==== Uncontrolled traffic ====
Uncontrolled traffic comes in the absence of lane markings and traffic control signals. On roads without marked lanes, drivers tend to keep to the appropriate side if the road is wide enough. Drivers frequently overtake others. Obstructions are common.

Intersections have no signals or signage, and a particular road at a busy intersection may be dominant – that is, its traffic flows – until a break in traffic, at which time the dominance shifts to the other road where vehicles are queued. At the intersection of two perpendicular roads, a traffic jam may result if four vehicles face each other side-on.

=== Turning ===
Drivers often seek to turn onto another road or onto private property. The vehicle's blinking turn signals (commonly known as "blinkers" or "indicators") are often used as a way to announce one's intention to turn, thus alerting other drivers. The actual usage of directional signals varies greatly amongst countries, although its purpose is to indicate a driver's intention to depart from the current (and natural) flow of traffic well before the departure is executed (typically 3 seconds as a guideline).

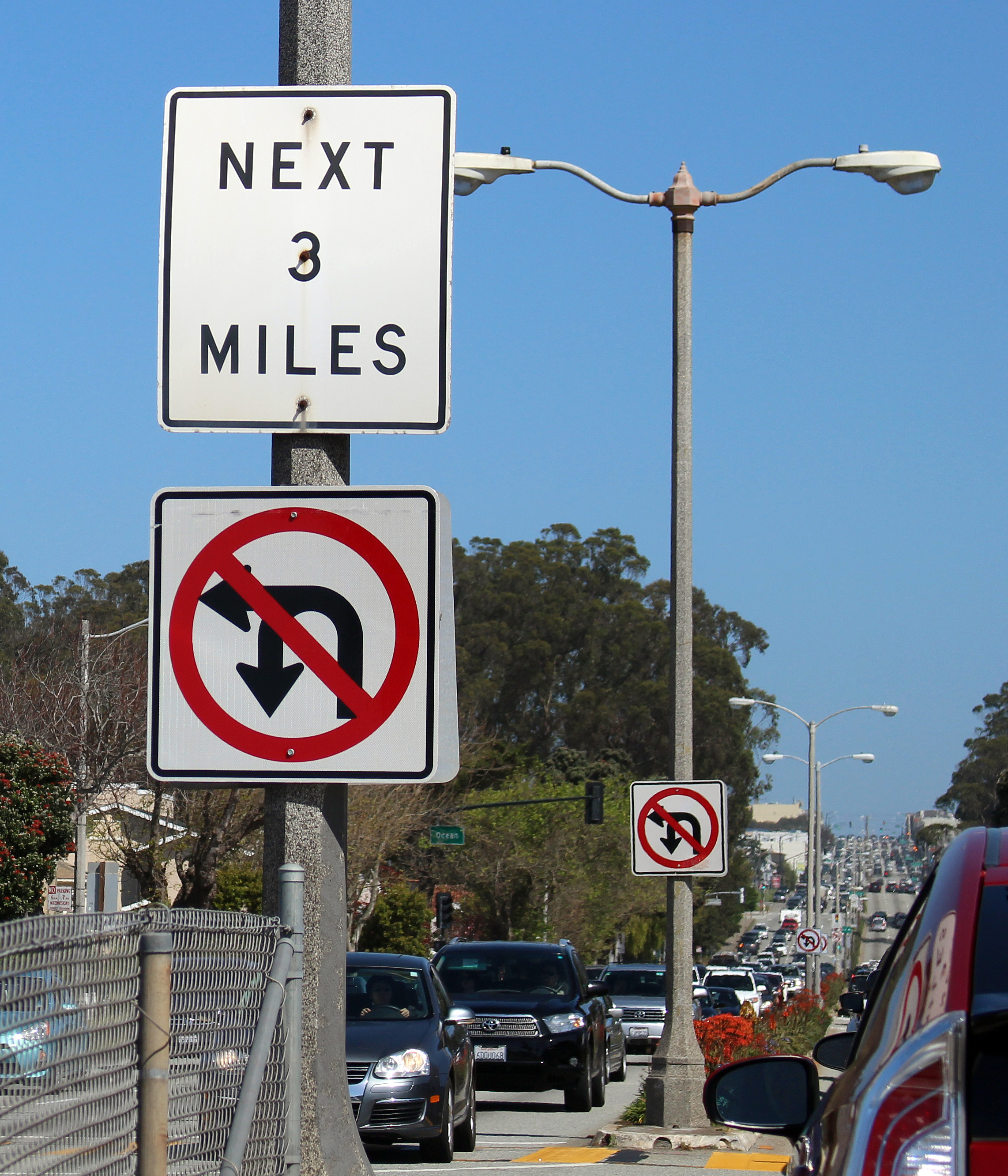
No left turns in San Francisco implies one must make three right turns

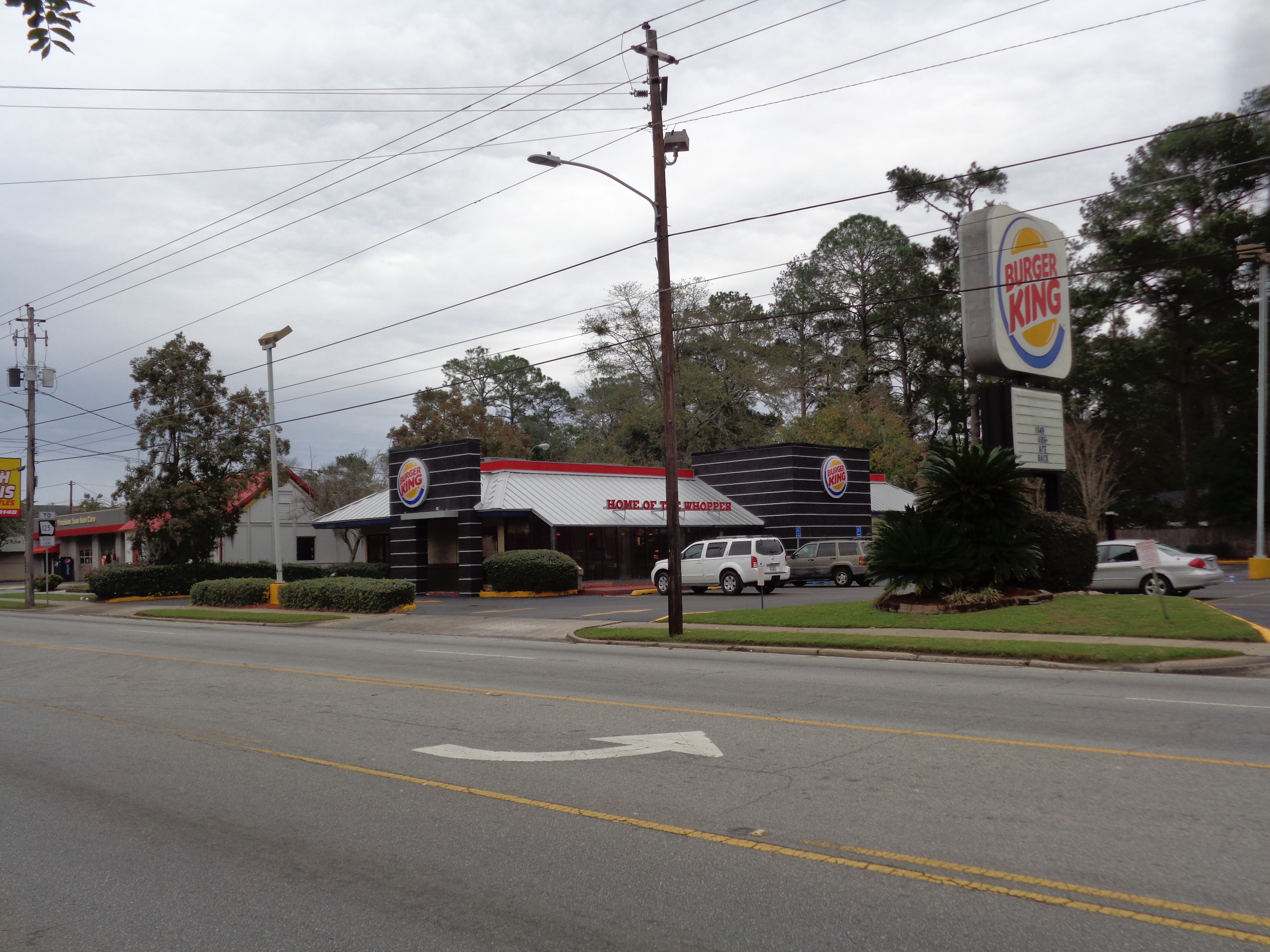
Center turn lane on a Georgia road

Turning towards the edge of the road closest to a vehicle usually requires a driver to look out only for pedestrians and bicyclists.

Turning towards the opposing edge of the road usually requires a vehicle to cross opposing traffic. In this scenario, a driver often must stop and wait for a gap to turn, and if stopped in a through lane, such a stop might cause inconvenience for vehicles following behind that do not wish to turn. This is why dedicated lanes and protected traffic signals for turning are sometimes provided.

On busier intersections where a protected lane would be ineffective or cannot be built, turning may be entirely prohibited, and drivers will be required to "drive around the block" in order to accomplish the turn. Many cities employ this tactic quite often; in San Francisco, due to its common practice, making three right turns is known colloquially as a "San Francisco left turn". Likewise, as many intersections in Taipei City are too busy to allow direct left turns, signs often direct drivers to drive around the block to turn.

Turning rules are by no means universal. For example, in New Zealand (a drive-on-the-left country) between 1977 and 2012, left turning traffic had to give way to opposing right-turning traffic wishing to take the same road (unless there were multiple lanes, but then one must take care in case a vehicle jumped lanes). New Zealand abolished this particular rule on 25 March 2012, except at roundabouts or when denoted by a Give Way or Stop sign. Although the rule caused initial driver confusion, and many intersections required or still require modification, the change is predicted to eventually prevent one death and 13 serious injuries annually.

On roads with multiple lanes, turning traffic is generally expected to move to the lane closest to the direction they wish to turn. For example, traffic intending to turn right will usually move to the rightmost lane before the intersection. Likewise, left-turning traffic will move to the leftmost lane. Exceptions to this rule may exist where for example the traffic authority decides that the two rightmost lanes will be for turning right, in which case drivers may take whichever of them to turn. Traffic may adapt to informal patterns that rise naturally rather than by force of authority. For example, it is common for drivers to observe (and trust) the turn signals used by other drivers in order to make turns from other lanes. If several vehicles on the right lane are all turning right, a vehicle may come from the next-to-right lane and turn right as well, in parallel with the other right-turning vehicles.

==== Intersections ====
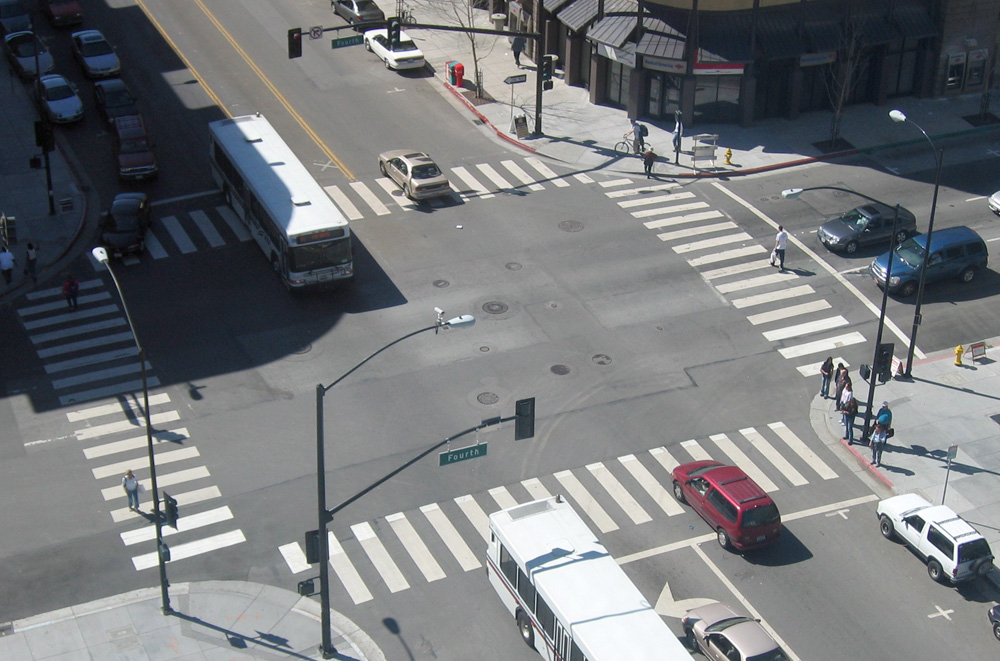
This intersection in San Jose, California has crosswalks, left-turn lanes, and traffic lights.

In most of Continental Europe, the default rule is to give priority to the right, but this may be overridden by signs or road markings. There, priority was initially given according to the social rank of each traveler, but early in the life of the automobile this rule was deemed impractical and replaced with the priorité à droite (priority to the right) rule, which still applies. At a traffic circle where priorité à droite is not overridden, traffic on what would otherwise be a roundabout gives way to traffic entering the circle. Most French roundabouts now have give-way signs for traffic entering the circle, but there remain some notable exceptions that operate on the old rule, such as the Place de l'Étoile around the Arc de Triomphe. Priority to the right where used in continental Europe may be overridden by an ascending hierarchy of markings, signs, signals, and authorized persons.

Roundabout in a country where traffic drives on the right. Traffic streams circularly around a central island after first yielding to circulating traffic. Unlike with traffic circles, vehicles on a roundabout have priority over the entering vehicle, parking is not allowed and pedestrians are usually prohibited from the central island.

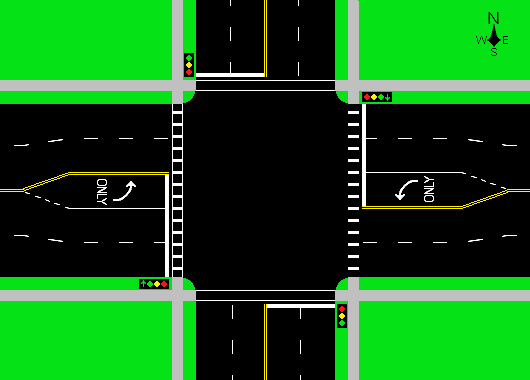
intersection of two-way streets as seen from above (traffic flows on the right side of the road). The east–west street has left turn lanes from both directions, but the north–south street does not have left turn lanes at this intersection. The east–west street traffic lights also have green left turn arrows to show when unhindered left turns can be made. Some possible markings for crosswalks are shown.

In the United Kingdom, priority is generally indicated by signs or markings, so that almost all junctions between public roads (except those governed by traffic signals) have a concept of a major road and minor road. The default give-way-to-the-right rule used in Continental Europe causes problems for many British and Irish drivers who are accustomed to having right of way by default unless otherwise indicated. A very small proportion of low-traffic junctions are unmarked – typically on housing estates or in rural areas. Here the rule is to "proceed with great care" i.e. slow the vehicle and check for traffic on the intersecting road.

Other countries use various methods similar to the above examples to establish the right of way at intersections. For example, in most of the United States, the default priority is to yield to traffic from the right, but this is usually overridden by traffic control devices or other rules, like the boulevard rule. This rule holds that traffic entering a major road from a smaller road or alley must yield to the traffic of the busier road, but signs are often still posted. The boulevard rule can be compared with the above concept of a major and minor road, or the priority roads that may be found in countries that are parties to the Vienna Convention on Road Signs and Signals.

Perpendicular intersections

Also known as a "four-way" intersection, this intersection is the most common configuration for roads that cross each other, and the most basic type.

If traffic signals do not control a four-way intersection, signs or other features are typically used to control movements and make clear priorities. The most common arrangement is to indicate that one road has priority over the other, but there are complex cases where all traffic approaching an intersection must yield and may be required to stop.

In the United States, South Africa, and Canada, there are four-way intersections with a stop sign at every entrance, called four-way stops. A failed signal or a flashing red light is equivalent to a four-way stop, or an all-way stop. Special rules for four-way stops may include:

1. In the countries that use four-way stops, pedestrians always have priority at crosswalks – even at unmarked ones, which exist as the logical continuations of the sidewalks at every intersection with approximately right angles – unless signed or painted otherwise.
2. Whichever vehicle first stops at the stop line – or before the crosswalk, if there is no stop line – has priority.
3. If two vehicles stop at the same time, priority is given to the vehicle on the right.
4. If several vehicles arrive at the same time, a right-of-way conflict may arise wherein no driver has the legal right-of-way. This may result in drivers informally signaling to other drivers to indicate their intent to yield, for example by waving or flashing headlights.

In Europe and other places, there are similar intersections. These may be marked by special signs (according to the Vienna Convention on Road Signs and Signals), a danger sign with a black X representing a crossroads. This sign informs drivers that the intersection is uncontrolled and that default rules apply. In Europe and in many areas of North America the default rules that apply at uncontrolled four-way intersections are almost identical:

1. Rules for pedestrians differ by country, in the United States and Canada pedestrians generally have priority at such an intersection.
2. All vehicles must give priority to any traffic approaching from their right,
3. Then, if the vehicle is turning right or continuing on the same road it may proceed.
4. Vehicles turning left must also give priority to traffic approaching from the opposite direction, unless that traffic is also turning left.
5. If the intersection is congested, vehicles must alternate directions and/or circulate priority to the right one vehicle at a time.

==== Protected intersection for bicycles ====
A number of features make this protected intersection. A corner refuge island, a setback crossing of the pedestrians and cyclists, generally between 1.5–7 metres of setback, a forward stop bar, which allows cyclists to stop for a traffic light well ahead of motor traffic who must stop behind the crosswalk. Separate signal staging or at least an advance green for cyclists and pedestrians is used to give cyclists and pedestrians no conflicts or a head start over traffic. The design makes a right turn on red, and sometimes left on red depending on the geometry of the intersection in question, possible in many cases, often without stopping.

This type of intersection is common in the bicycle-friendly Netherlands.

Protected intersection design based on a common Dutch model, preserving the physical segregation of the cycle lane throughout the intersection

==== Pedestrian crossings ====
Pedestrians must often cross from one side of a road to the other, and in doing so may come into the way of vehicles traveling on the road. In many places pedestrians are entirely left to look after themselves, that is, they must observe the road and cross when they can see that no traffic will threaten them. Busier cities usually provide pedestrian crossings, which are strips of the road where pedestrians are expected to cross.

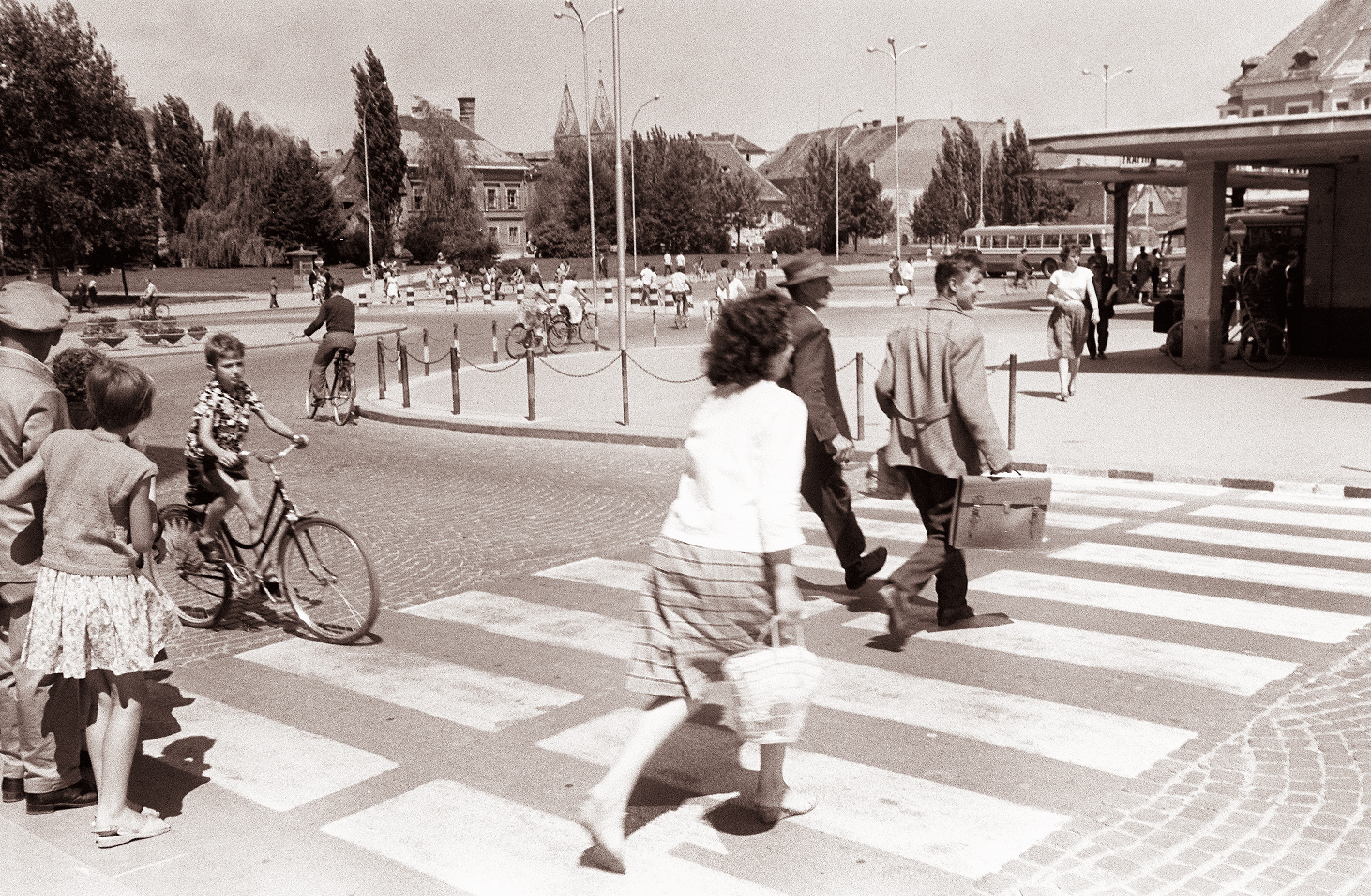
Slovenia, 1961

The actual appearance of pedestrian crossings varies greatly, but the two most common appearances are: (1) a series of lateral white stripes or (2) two longitudinal white lines. The former is usually preferred, as it stands out more conspicuously against the dark pavement.

Some pedestrian crossings accompany a traffic signal to make vehicles stop at regular intervals so pedestrians can cross. Some countries have "intelligent" pedestrian signals, where the pedestrian must push a button in order to assert their intention to cross. In some countries, approaching traffic is monitored by radar or by electromagnetic sensors buried in the road surface, and the pedestrian crossing lights are set to red if a speed infringement is detected. This has the effect of enforcing the local speed limit. See Speed Limits below.

Pedestrian crossings without traffic signals are also common. In this case, the traffic laws usually states that the pedestrian has the right of way when crossing, and that vehicles must stop when a pedestrian uses the crossing. Countries and driving cultures vary greatly as to the extent to which this is respected. In the state of Nevada the car has the right of way when the crosswalk signal specifically forbids pedestrian crossing. Traffic culture is a determinant factor for the behaviors of all road users’ traffic. Specifically, it has a main role in crashes.

Some jurisdictions forbid crossing or using the road anywhere other than at crossings, termed jaywalking. In other areas, pedestrians may have the right to cross where they choose, and have right of way over vehicular traffic while crossing.

In most areas, an intersection is considered to have a crosswalk, even if not painted, as long as the roads meet at approximate right angles. The United Kingdom and Croatia are among the exceptions.

Pedestrian crossings may also be located away from intersections.

=== Level crossings ===
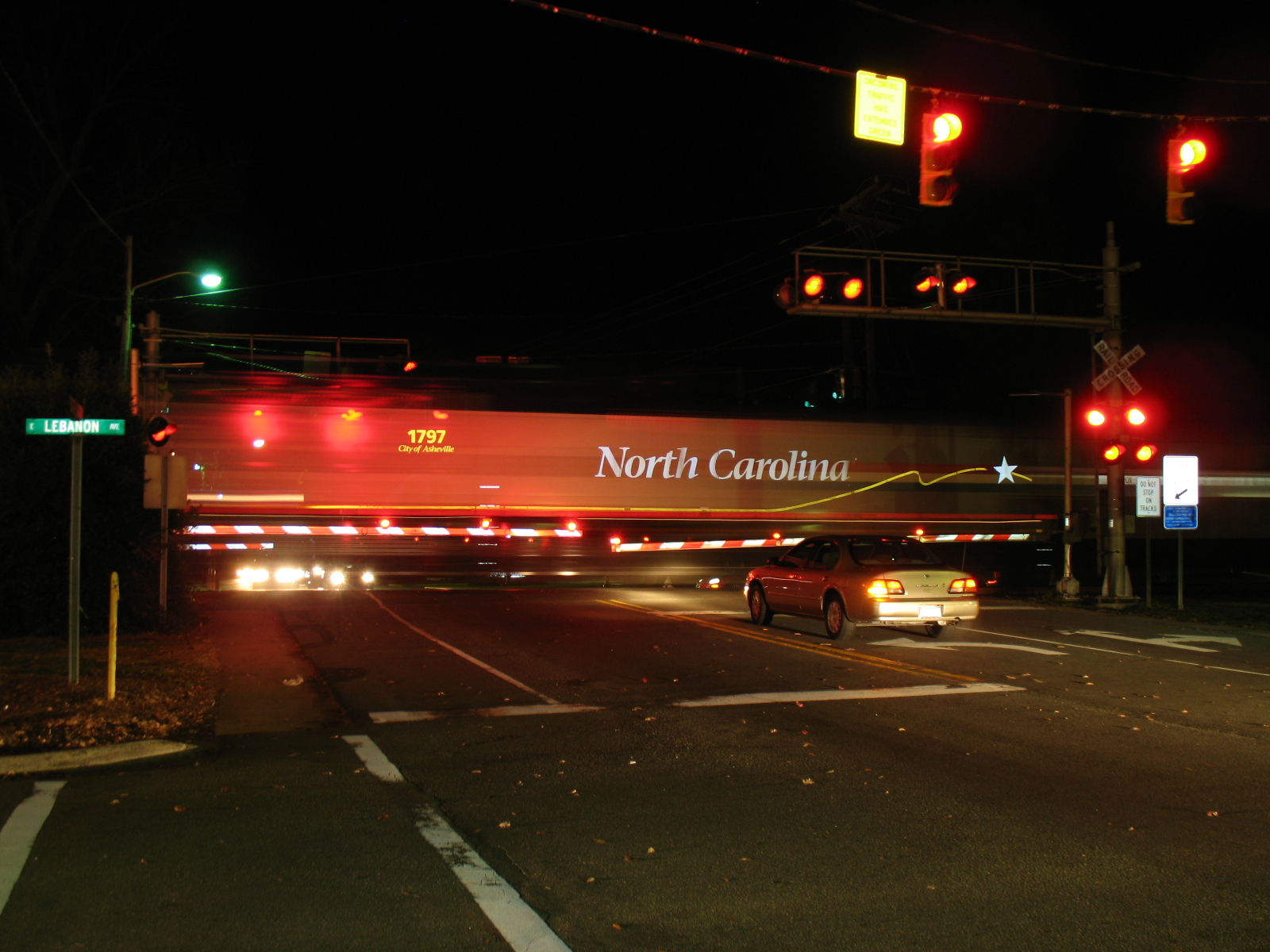
An example of a typical level crossing in the United States as an Amtrak Carolinian and Piedmont train passes through

A level crossing is an at-grade intersection of a railway by a road. Because of safety issues, they are often equipped with closable gates, crossing bells and warning signs.

=== Speed limits ===
The higher the speed of a vehicle, the more difficult collision avoidance becomes and the greater the damage if a collision does occur. Therefore, many countries of the world limit the maximum speed allowed on their roads. Vehicles are not supposed to be driven at speeds which are higher than the posted maximum.

To enforce speed limits, two approaches are generally employed. In the United States, it is common for the police to patrol the streets and use special equipment (typically a radar unit) to measure the speed of vehicles, and pull over any vehicle found to be in violation of the speed limit. In Brazil, Colombia and some European countries, there are computerized speed-measuring devices spread throughout the city, which will automatically detect speeding drivers and take a photograph of the license plate (or number plate), which is later used for applying and mailing the ticket. Many jurisdictions in the U.S. use this technology as well.

A mechanism that was developed in Germany is the Grüne Welle, or green wave, which is an indicator that shows the optimal speed to travel for the synchronized green lights along that corridor. Driving faster or slower than the speed set by the behavior of the lights causes the driver to encounter many red lights. This discourages drivers from speeding or impeding the flow of traffic. See related traffic wave and Pedestrian Crossings, above.

=== Overtaking ===
Overtaking (or passing) refers to a maneuver by which one or more vehicles traveling in the same direction are passed by another vehicle. On two-lane roads, when there is a split line or a dashed line on the side of the overtaker, drivers may overtake when it is safe. On multi-lane roads in most jurisdictions, overtaking is permitted in the "slower" lanes, though many require a special circumstance. See "Lanes" below.

In the United Kingdom and Canada, notably on extra-urban roads, a solid white or yellow line closer to the driver is used to indicate that no overtaking is allowed in that lane. A double white or yellow line means that neither side may overtake.

In the United States, a solid white line means that lane changes are discouraged and a double white line means that the lane change is prohibited.

==== Lanes ====
Changing lanes on an 8-lane road outside Gothenburg, Sweden

When a street is wide enough to accommodate several vehicles traveling side-by-side, it is usual for traffic to organize itself into lanes, that is, parallel corridors of traffic. Some roads have one lane for each direction of travel and others have multiple lanes for each direction. Most countries apply pavement markings to clearly indicate the limits of each lane and the direction of travel that it must be used for. In other countries lanes have no markings at all and drivers follow them mostly by intuition rather than visual stimulus.

On roads that have multiple lanes going in the same direction, drivers may usually shift amongst lanes as they please, but they must do so in a way that does not cause inconvenience to other drivers. Driving cultures vary greatly on the issue of "lane ownership": in some countries, drivers traveling in a lane will be very protective of their right to travel in it while in others drivers will routinely expect other drivers to shift back and forth.

Designation and overtaking

The usual designation for lanes on divided highways is the fastest lane is the one closest to the center of the road, and the slowest to the edge of the road. Drivers are usually expected to keep in the slowest lane unless overtaking, though with more traffic congestion all lanes are often used.

When driving on the left:

- The lane designated for faster traffic is on the right.
- The lane designated for slower traffic is on the left.
- Most freeway exits are on the left.
- Overtaking is permitted to the right, and sometimes to the left.

When driving on the right:

- The lane designated for faster traffic is on the left.
- The lane designated for slower traffic is on the right.
- Most freeway exits are on the right.
- Overtaking is permitted to the left, and sometimes to the right.

Countries party to the Vienna Convention on Road Traffic have uniform rules about overtaking and lane designation. The convention details (amongst other things) that "Every driver shall keep to the edge of the carriageway appropriate to the direction of traffic", and the "Drivers overtaking shall do so on the side opposite to that appropriate to the direction of traffic", notwithstanding the presence or absence of oncoming traffic. Allowed exceptions to these rules include turning or heavy traffic, traffic in lines, or situation in which signs or markings must dictate otherwise. These rules must be more strictly adhered to on roads with oncoming traffic, but still apply on multi-lane and divided highways. Many countries in Europe are party to the Vienna Conventions on traffic and roads. In Australia (which is not a contracting party), traveling in any lane other than the "slow" lane on a road with a speed limit at or above 80 km/h (50 mph) is an offence, unless signage is posted to the contrary or the driver is overtaking.

Many areas in North America do not have any laws about staying to the slowest lanes unless overtaking. In those areas, unlike many parts of Europe, traffic is allowed to overtake on any side, even in a slower lane. This practice is known as "passing on the right" in the United States and "overtaking on the inside" and "undertaking" in the United Kingdom. When referring to individual lanes on dual carriageways, one does not consider traffic travelling the opposite direction. The inside lane (in the British English sense, i.e. the lane beside the hard shoulder) refers to the lane used for normal travel, while the middle lane is used for overtaking cars on the inside lane. The outside lane (i.e. closest to oncoming traffic) is used for overtaking vehicles in the middle lane. The same principle lies with dual carriageways with more than three lanes.

U.S.-state-specific practices

In some US states (such as Louisiana, Massachusetts and New York), although there are laws requiring all traffic on a public way to use the right-most lane unless overtaking, this rule is often ignored and seldom enforced on multi-lane roadways. Some states, such as Colorado, use a combination of laws and signs restricting speeds or vehicles on certain lanes to emphasize overtaking only on the left lane, and to avoid a psychological condition commonly called road rage.

In California, cars may use any lane on multi-lane roadways. Drivers moving slower than the general flow of traffic are required to stay in the right-most lanes (by California Vehicle Code (CVC) 21654) to keep the way clear for faster vehicles and thus speed up traffic. However, faster drivers may legally pass in the slower lanes if conditions allow (by CVC 21754). But the CVC also requires trucks to stay in the right lane, or in the right two lanes if the roadway has four or more lanes going in their direction. The oldest freeways in California, and some freeway interchanges, often have ramps on the left, making signs like "TRUCKS OK ON LEFT LANE" or "TRUCKS MAY USE ALL LANES" necessary to override the default rule. Lane splitting, or riding motorcycles in the space between cars in traffic, is permitted as long as it is done in a safe and prudent manner.

=== One-way roadways ===
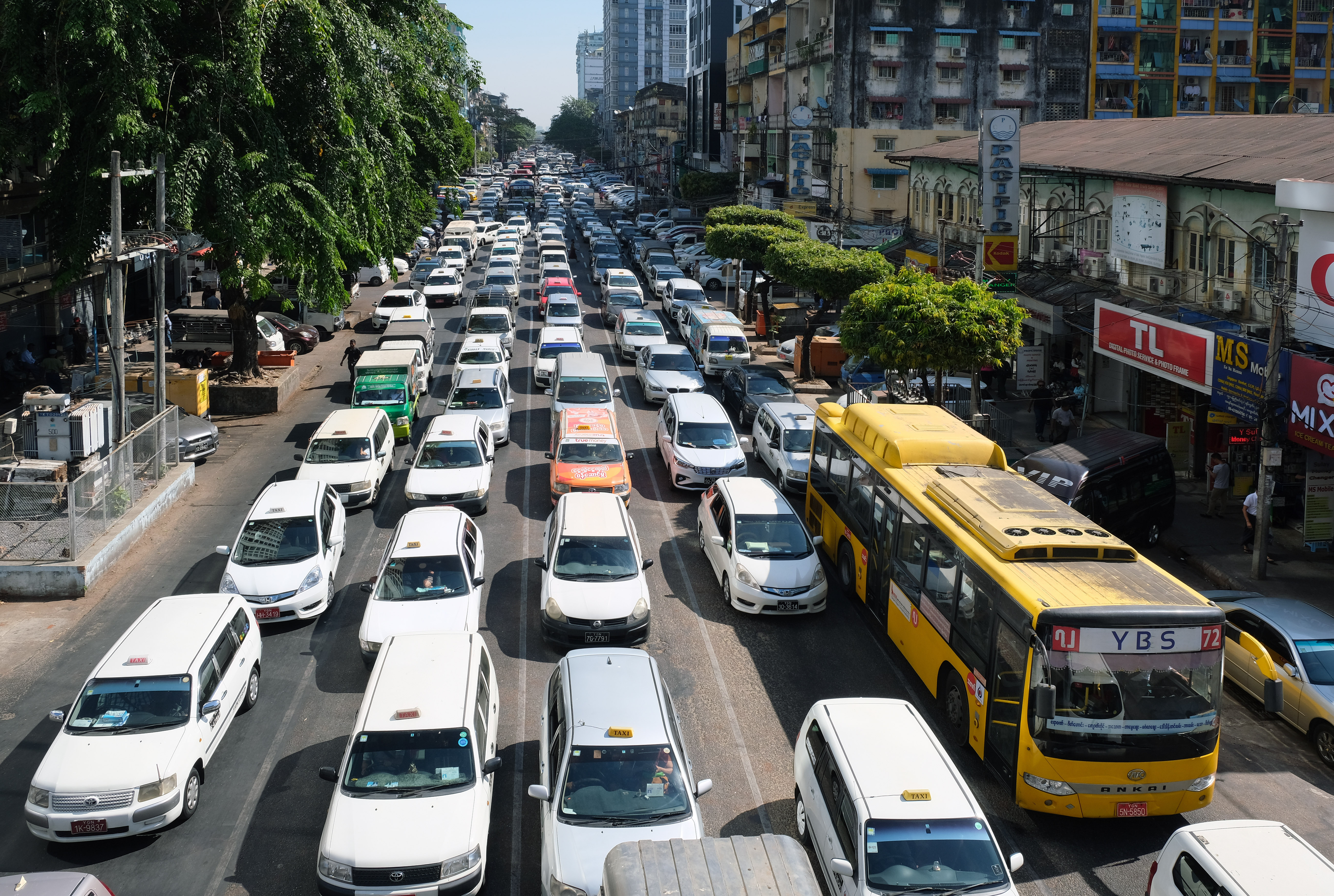
One-way traffic on Anawrahta road, Yangon

In order to increase traffic capacity and safety, a route may have two or more separate roads for each direction of traffic. Alternatively, a given road might be declared one-way.

==== High-speed roads ====
In large cities, moving from one part of the city to another by means of ordinary streets and avenues can be time-consuming since traffic is often slowed by at-grade junctions, tight turns, narrow marked lanes and lack of a minimum speed limit. Therefore, it has become common practice for larger cities to build roads for faster through traffic. There are two different types of roads used to provide high-speed access across urban areas:

- The controlled-access highway (freeway or motorway) is a divided multi-lane highway with fully controlled access and grade-separated intersections (no cross traffic). Some freeways are called expressways, super-highways, or turnpikes, depending on local usage. Access to freeways is fully controlled; entering and leaving the freeway is permitted only at grade-separated interchanges.
- The limited-access road (often called expressway in areas where the name does not refer to a freeway or motorway) is a lower-grade type of road with some or many of the characteristics of a controlled-access highway: usually a broad multi-lane avenue, frequently divided, with some grade separation at intersections.

Motor vehicle drivers wishing to travel over great distances within the city will usually take the freeways or expressways in order to minimize travel time. When a crossing road is at the same grade as the freeway, a bridge (or, less often, an underpass) will be built for the crossing road. If the freeway is elevated, the crossing road will pass underneath it.

Minimum speed signs are sometimes posted (although increasingly rare) and usually indicate that any vehicle traveling slower than 40 mph (64 km/h) should indicate a slower speed of travel to other motor vehicles by engaging the vehicle's four-way flashing lights. Alternative slower-than-posted speeds may be in effect, based on the posted speed limit of the highway/freeway.

Systems of freeways and expressways are also built to connect distant and regional cities, notable systems include the Interstate highways, the Autobahnen and the Expressway Network of the People's Republic of China.

==== One-way streets ====
In more sophisticated systems such as large cities, this concept is further extended: some streets are marked as being one-way, and on those streets all traffic must flow in only one direction. Pedestrians on the sidewalks are generally not limited to one-way movement. Drivers wishing to reach a destination they have already passed must return via other streets. One-way streets, despite the inconveniences to some individual drivers, can greatly improve traffic flow since they usually allow traffic to move faster and tend to simplify intersections.

== Congested traffic ==
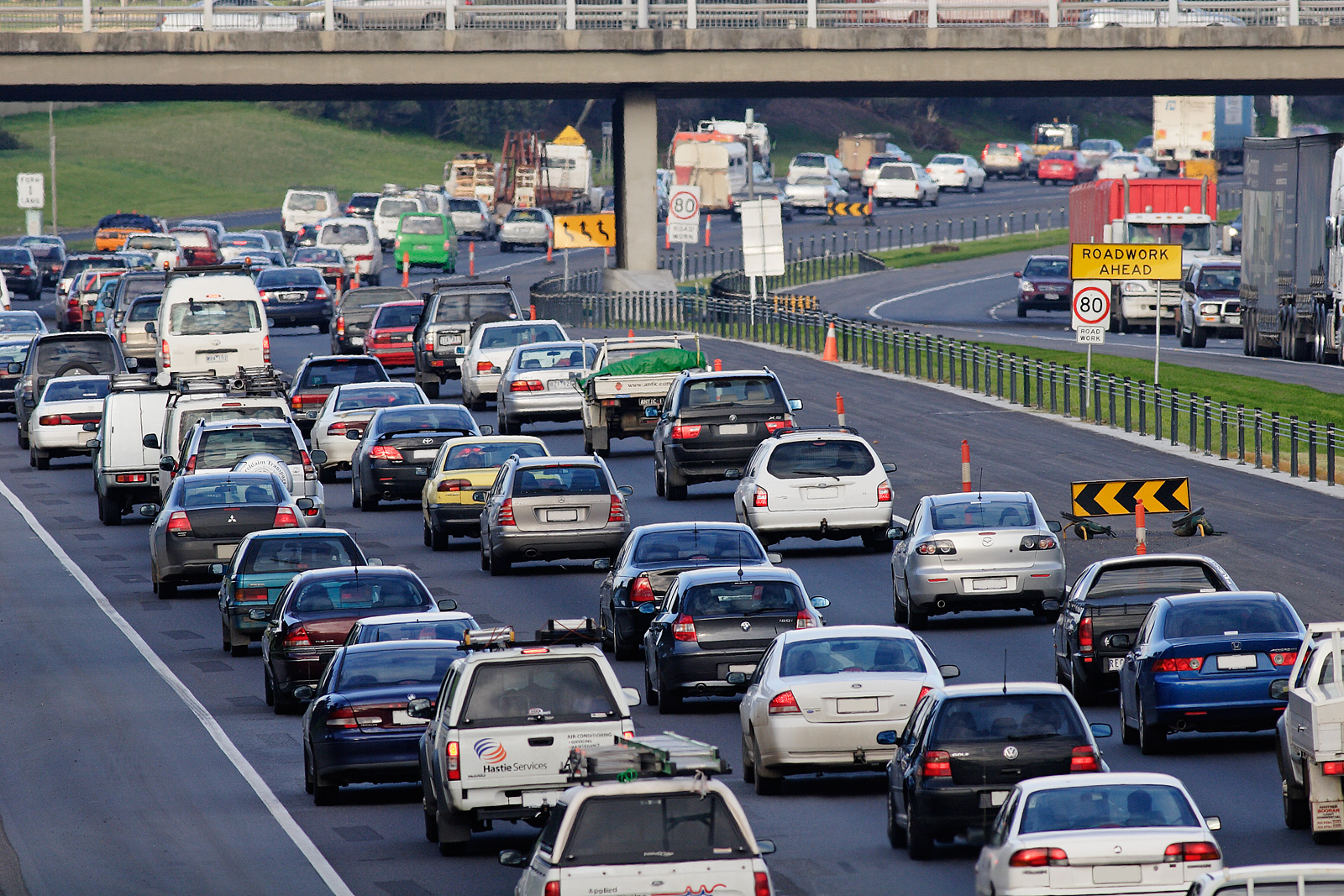
Traffic slows to a crawl on the Monash Freeway in Melbourne, Australia through peak hour traffic.

In some places traffic volume is consistently, extremely large, either during periods of time referred to as rush hour or perpetually. Exceptionally, traffic upstream of a vehicular collision or an obstruction, such as construction, may also be constrained, resulting in a traffic jam. Such dynamics in relation to traffic congestion is known as traffic flow. Traffic engineers sometimes gauge the quality of traffic flow in terms of level of service.

In measured traffic data, common spatiotemporal empirical features of traffic congestion have been found that are qualitatively the same for different highways in different countries. Some of these common features distinguish the wide moving jam and synchronized flow phases of congested traffic in Kerner's three-phase traffic theory.

=== Rush hour ===
During business days in most major cities, traffic congestion reaches great intensity at predictable times of the day due to the large number of vehicles using the road at the same time. This phenomenon is called rush hour or peak hour, although the period of high traffic intensity often exceeds one hour. Since the advent of car radios, radio programming during rush hour is likely to be called drive time.

== Congestion mitigation ==
=== Rush hour policies ===
Some cities adopt policies to reduce rush-hour traffic and pollution and encourage the use of public transportation. For example, in São Paulo, Manila and in Mexico City, each vehicle has a specific day of the week in which it is forbidden from traveling the roads during rush hour. The day for each vehicle is taken from the license plate number, and this rule is enforced by traffic police and also by hundreds of strategically positioned traffic cameras backed by computerized image-recognition systems that issue tickets to offending drivers.

In the United States and Canada, several expressways have a special lane (called an "HOV Lane" – High Occupancy Vehicle Lane) that can only be used by cars carrying two (some locations-three) or more people. Also, many major cities have instituted strict parking prohibitions during rush hour on major arterial streets leading to and from the central business district. During designated weekday hours, vehicles parked on these primary routes are subject to prompt ticketing and towing at owner expense. The purpose of these restrictions is to make available an additional traffic lane in order to maximize available traffic capacity. Additionally, several cities offer a public telephone service where citizens can arrange rides with others depending on where they live and work. The purpose of these policies is to reduce the number of vehicles on the roads and thus reduce rush-hour traffic intensity.

Metered freeways are also a solution for controlling rush hour traffic. In Phoenix, Arizona and Seattle, Washington, among other places, metered on-ramps have been implemented. During rush hour, traffic signals are used with green lights to allow one car per blink of the light to proceed on to the freeway.

Rush hour is typically caused by multiple cars all going to once place at the same time. There is no way to fix the issue because the economy has set times for work, school, and running errands all during the same hours. There is no avoiding this problem because it exists in every major metropolitan area in the world.

=== Pre-emption ===
In some areas, emergency responders are provided with specialized equipment, such as a Mobile Infrared Transmitter, which allows emergency response vehicles, particularly fire-fighting apparatus, to have high-priority travel by having the lights along their route change to green. The technology behind these methods has evolved, from panels at the fire department (which could trigger and control green lights for certain major corridors) to optical systems (which the individual fire apparatus can be equipped with to communicate directly with receivers on the signal head). In certain jurisdictions, public transport buses and government-operated winter service vehicles are permitted to use this equipment to extend the length of a green light.

During emergencies where evacuation of a heavily populated area is required, local authorities may institute contraflow lane reversal, in which all lanes of a road lead away from a danger zone regardless of their original flow. Aside from emergencies, contraflow may also be used to ease traffic congestion during rush hour or at the end of a sports event (where a large number of cars are leaving the venue at the same time). For example, the six lanes of the Lincoln Tunnel can be changed from three inbound and three outbound to a two/four configuration depending on traffic volume. The Brazilian highways Rodovia dos Imigrantes and Rodovia Anchieta connect São Paulo to the Atlantic coast. Almost all lanes of both highways are usually reversed during weekends to allow for heavy seaside traffic. The reversibility of the highways requires many additional highway ramps and complicated interchanges.

=== Intelligent transportation systems ===
An intelligent transportation system (ITS) is a system of hardware, software, and operators-in-the-loop that allow better monitoring and control of traffic in order to optimize traffic flow. As the number of vehicle lane miles traveled per year continues to increase dramatically, and as the number of vehicle lane miles constructed per year has not been keeping pace, this has led to ever-increasing traffic congestion. As a cost-effective solution toward optimizing traffic, ITS presents a number of technologies to reduce congestion by monitoring traffic flows through the use of sensors and live cameras or analysing cellular phone data travelling in cars (floating car data) and in turn rerouting traffic as needed through the use of variable message boards (VMS), highway advisory radio, on board or off board navigation devices and other systems through integration of traffic data with navigation systems. Additionally, the roadway network has been increasingly fitted with additional communications and control infrastructure to allow traffic operations personnel to monitor weather conditions, for dispatching maintenance crews to perform snow or ice removal, as well as intelligent systems such as automated bridge de-icing systems which help to prevent accidents.

== Aviation ==
In aviation, right-of-way rules are established over the principle that the least maneuverable aircraft takes priority. In the United States, the Code of Federal Regulations ranks air traffic in the following passage order:

- Any aircraft in distress
- Air balloon
- Glider
- Airship
  - An aircraft towing or refueling other aircraft has the right-of-way over all other engine-driven aircraft
- Powered parachute, weight-shift-control aircraft, airplane, and rotorcraft

In addition, head-on approaching aircraft shall alter course to the right. An aircraft being overtaken has the right-of-way. A landing aircraft has the right-of-way over other surface-operating aircraft.

== See also ==
- Bicycle safety
- Braess's paradox
- Cross-sea traffic ways
- Induced demand
- Institute of Transportation Engineers
- Journal of Transport and Land Use
- Last clear chance
- Line source
- Multistorey car park
- Road traffic control device
- Road traffic safety
- Road transport
- Three-phase traffic theory
- Traffic flow
- Traffic light
- Traffic network analysis
- Traffic psychology
- Traffic law
- Trafficability
- Transportation forecasting
