= MIRT =

MIRT may refer to:

- Mobile Infrared Transmitter, a device used by buses and emergency vehicles to control traffic lights
- Mario in Real-Time, a digital puppetry system by Nintendo
