= Road traffic control device =

Road traffic control devices are markers, signs and signal devices used to inform, guide and control traffic, including pedestrians, motor vehicle drivers and bicyclists. These devices are usually placed adjacent, over or along the highways, roads, traffic facilities and other public areas that require traffic control.

== Types ==
=== Signs ===
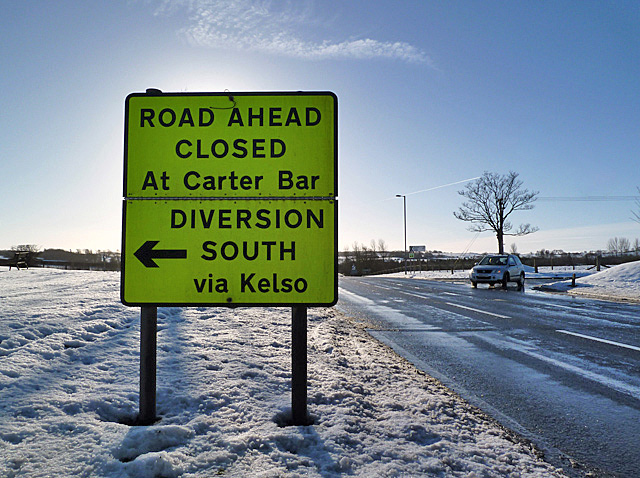
Roadsign signalling a diversion in St Boswells, Scotland

Traffic signs are signs which use words and/or symbols to convey information to road users. These devices are made with retroreflective materials that reflect light from headlights back towards the driver's eyes. This is to achieve maximum visibility, especially at night.

==== Traditional ====
- Regulatory signs are traffic signs used to convey traffic rules and regulations such as intersection controls, weight limit, speed limit, one way, no parking and others. These signs are generally rectangular in shape and use white, black and red/or as their primary colors.
- Warning signs are traffic signs that are used to warn road users about a potential danger. These signs are usually diamond in shape and, except for temporary traffic control signs, have black legends and borders on a yellow background. Work zone signs have orange backgrounds, and incident management signs have pink backgrounds. Examples of warning signs are crosswalk signs, curve warning signs, intersection ahead signs, flagger signs, workers signs, or road machinery signs.
- Guide signs help road users navigate to their destination. These signs are generally rectangular in shape and have white text on green backgrounds. When a guide sign provides temporary guidance due to a work zone, it will have a black legend and border on an orange background. Examples of guide signs are street name signs, destination and distance signs, and place name signs. Work zone guide signs include detour markers, length of work signs, and end road work signs.

==== Variable ====
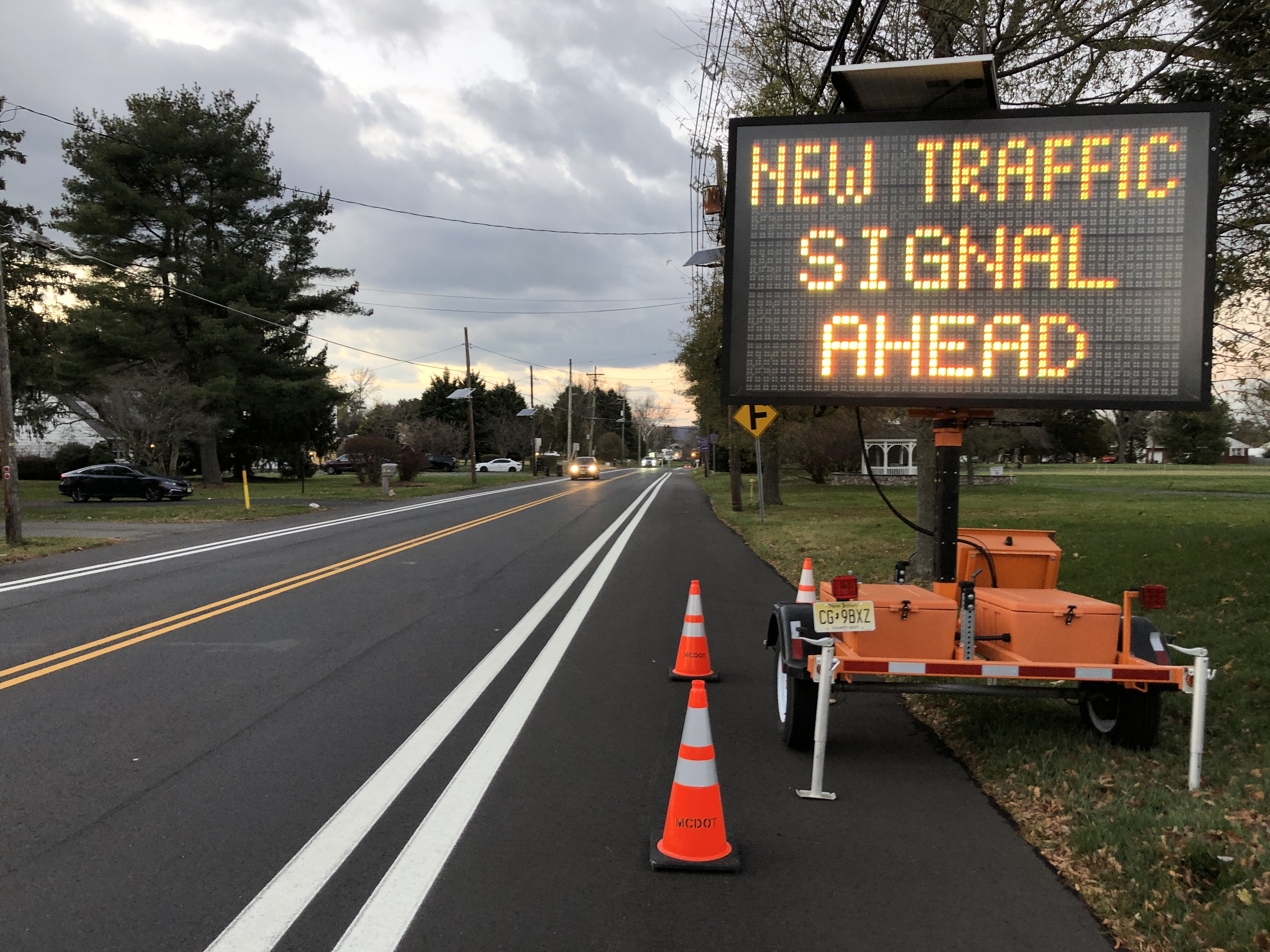
Variable message sign in Mercer County, New Jersey

Variable-message signs, or VMS, are electronic traffic control signs which can display different traffic messages according to the needs of a specific road. Permanent VMS displays are mounted on large sign structures overhead or alongside the road. These devices are often placed on urban freeways which have traffic problems. Portable CMS (PVMS) panels are usually mounted on trailers, although some may be carried by trucks. They are often used in work zones or other events that disrupt traffic. CMS devices also follow a uniform shape, design and color that were set by the Manual on Uniform Traffic Control Devices.

=== High-level warnings ===
High-level warning devices are traffic control devices that are high enough to see over other vehicles, such as vehicle roofs, poles, and other places not lower than eight feet (2.4 m). These devices are also called "flag trees" because they feature two or three square fluorescent orange flags and, sometimes, a flashing warning light. This type of traffic control devices are used in work zones in high traffic density urban areas.

=== Channelizing devices ===
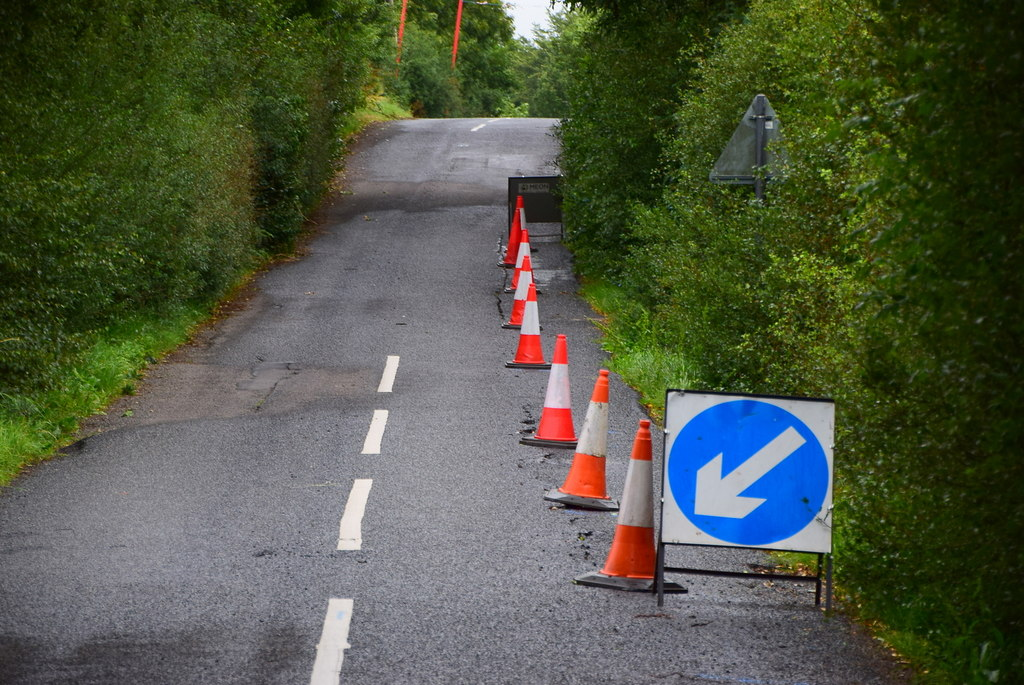
A line of traffic cones

Channelizing devices are used to warn drivers and pedestrians and to guide them through a work zone. Common channelizing devices are traffic cones and drums. These types of traffic control devices are usually placed between traffic and road construction zones, or between opposing traffic streams.

- Arrow boards are portable, illuminated, high-visibility panels that are used to alert motorists of an approaching lane closure and to specify the direction in which to merge.
- Traffic cones are channelizing devices shaped like cones, thus the name. They are made from bright orange flexible materials, not less than 18 inches (0.46 m) in height. Cones used at night must have bands of reflective material near the top. These are used to close a particular area or divide traffic lanes temporarily.
- Tubular markers are cylindrical in shape. They are also orange, with bands of reflective material near the top. They must be at least 18 inches (0.46 m) in height and 2 inches (51 mm) in body diameter. Tubular markers are made of flexible plastic and have a wider base that is glued or screwed to the pavement. They are used in a similar way as cones.
- Vertical panels are reflective traffic control devices which measure at least 8 inches (200 mm) wide and 24 inches (610 mm) high. They are bright orange with diagonal white stripes. These panels are used to guide vehicle traffic. They can be more conspicuous than cones or tubular markers when viewed head-on, but are very thin and hard to see from the side.
- Construction barrels or drums are cylindrical devices that are used when conspicuity is vital. These device are made with industrial-grade orange plastic and covered with alternating orange and white retroreflective stripes. These drums are usually ballasted with a heavy rubber base or a sandbag in the bottom for added stability.
- Barricades are channelizing devices used to redirect traffic on high-speed roads and expressways. There are different types of barricades depending on its size, design and applications. Barricades may be a fixed or portable traffic control device. Barricades are also used to close roads and/or sidewalks.
- Temporary raised islands are pavements that are usually 4 inches (100 mm) in height and 18 inches (460 mm) wide that are used for temporary traffic control applications. This device follows the standard design set by the AASHTO Roadside Design Guide.
- Jersey barriers are installed to provide added protection of the work zone from adjacent traffic and vice versa.

=== Road surface markings ===
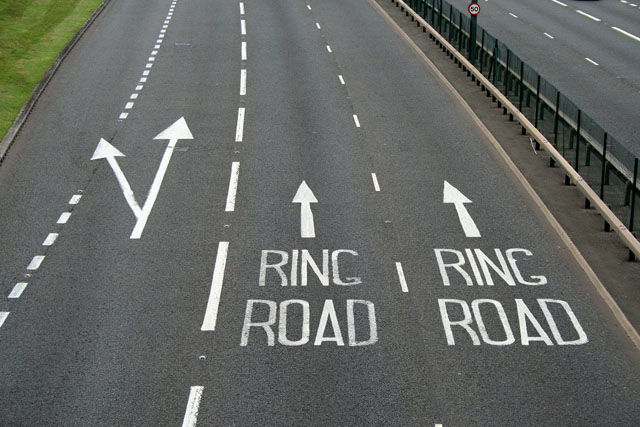
Lane markings in the United Kingdom

Road surface markings are traffic control devices that are applied directly to the road surfaces. They are used to guide and channel traffic by designating lanes and indicating stopping points at intersections. Pavement markings may be permanent or removable.

- Interim markings are temporary markings used in place of a pavement for two weeks or until a real pavement is installed in that specific area. These broken-line markings are at least ten feet (3.0 m) in length.
- Raised pavement markers are used to supplement or replace pavement markings. They may have embedded reflectors or may be non-reflective.
- Delineators are small reflective panels mounted on lightweight metal posts or flexible plastic tubes used to outline roadways and paths. These are about 1.2 metres (3 ft 11 in) high. In the USA, yellow reflective material is used for delineators on the left of the road, and white delineators are used to the right of traffic. In Queensland, Australia, where vehicles drive on the left side of the road, roadworks delineators shall comprise red delineators on the left side and white delineators on the right (two-way roadway) or yellow on the right (one-way roadway). Delineators should be erected one metre (39 in) minimum from the edge of the travelled path and at a uniform height of approximately one metre above the road surface. Delineator posts should be frangible or otherwise non-hazardous.

=== Rumble strips ===
Rumble strips are roughened surfaces that are either embossed or recessed. When a vehicle drives over them, they make a loud rumbling sound and vibration. They can be placed across traffic lanes to alert drivers that they are approaching a potentially hazardous location, such as a work zone, school zone, rail road crossing or an isolated intersection. They are used along the shoulders or centerlines of highways to alert drivers that they are leaving their traffic lane.

=== Lights ===
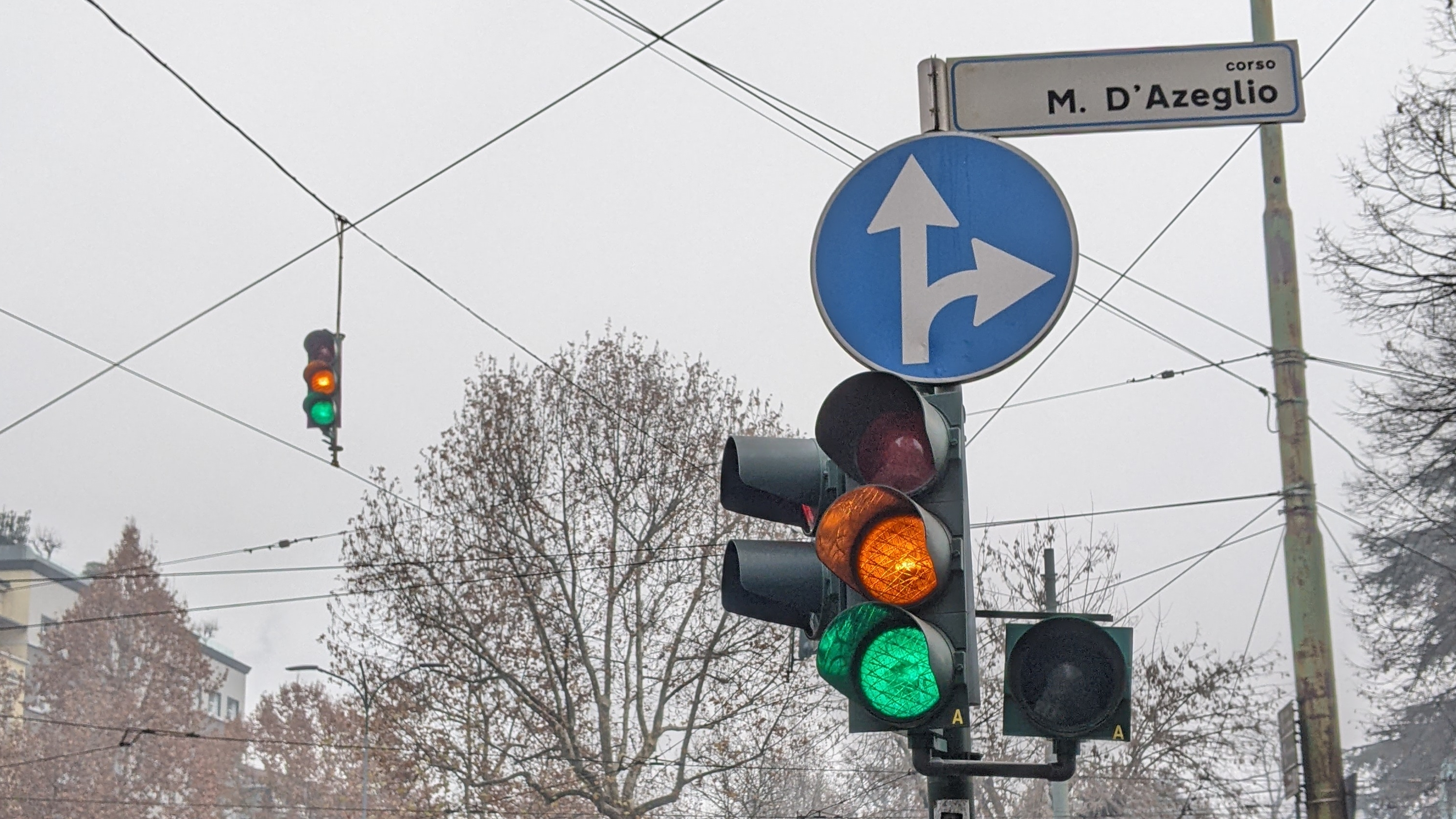
Traffic lights in Turin, Italy

Traffic lights are traffic control signals used to alternately assign right-of-way to traffic moving in conflicting directions at an intersection. Traffic lights feature three different lights that conveys different meanings. The red light means that the vehicle facing the traffic light must come to a complete stop. A green light means that the vehicle facing the traffic light may proceed when it is safe to do so. A yellow light indicates that a red light will follow, and vehicle drivers must stop if it is safe to do so.

- Flashing beacons are flashing signals. Yellow flashing beacons are usually used to draw attention to other traffic control devices, such as a crosswalk sign. Red flashing beacons are used to supplement stop signs.
- Steady burning electric lamps work similarly to flashing electric lights except that its yellow lights are not flashing. These are commonly used for on-road maintenance work.
- Warning lights are portable, battery or solar powered lighting devices that can work as flashing or steady burning lights. These devices are commonly mounted on drums or barricades. They follow the standards set by the ITE Purchase Specification for Flashing and Steady-Burn Warning Lights.
