= Road traffic control =

Directing of vehicular and pedestrian traffic

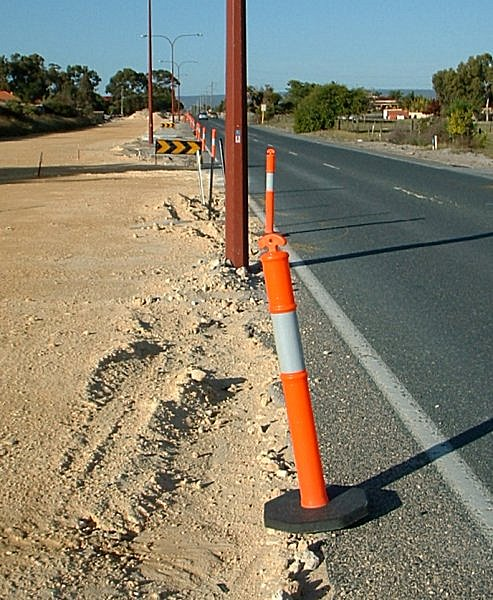
Traffic control bollards separating the road from the worksite. The chevron signs indicating worksite exit points.

Road traffic control involves directing vehicular and pedestrian traffic around a construction zone, accident or other road disruption, thus ensuring the safety of emergency response teams, construction workers and the general public.

Traffic control also includes the use of CCTV and other means of monitoring traffic by local or state roadways authorities to manage traffic flows and providing advice concerning traffic congestion.

Traffic Control Technicians (TCTs) or Traffic Control Supervisors (TCSs) are often known as "lollipop men" (usually this name only applies to TCTs working near schools to aid pupils in road crossing) from the appearance of their Stop/Slow signs, known as "Stop bats".

== Overview ==
Road Traffic control is an outdoors occupation, night or day for long hours in all weathers, and is considered a dangerous occupation due to the high risk of being struck by passing vehicles. Safety equipment is vitally important. Fatigue is a big issue, as tired TCTs may forget to watch their traffic, or may inadvertently turn their "Stop bats" to the "Slow" position.

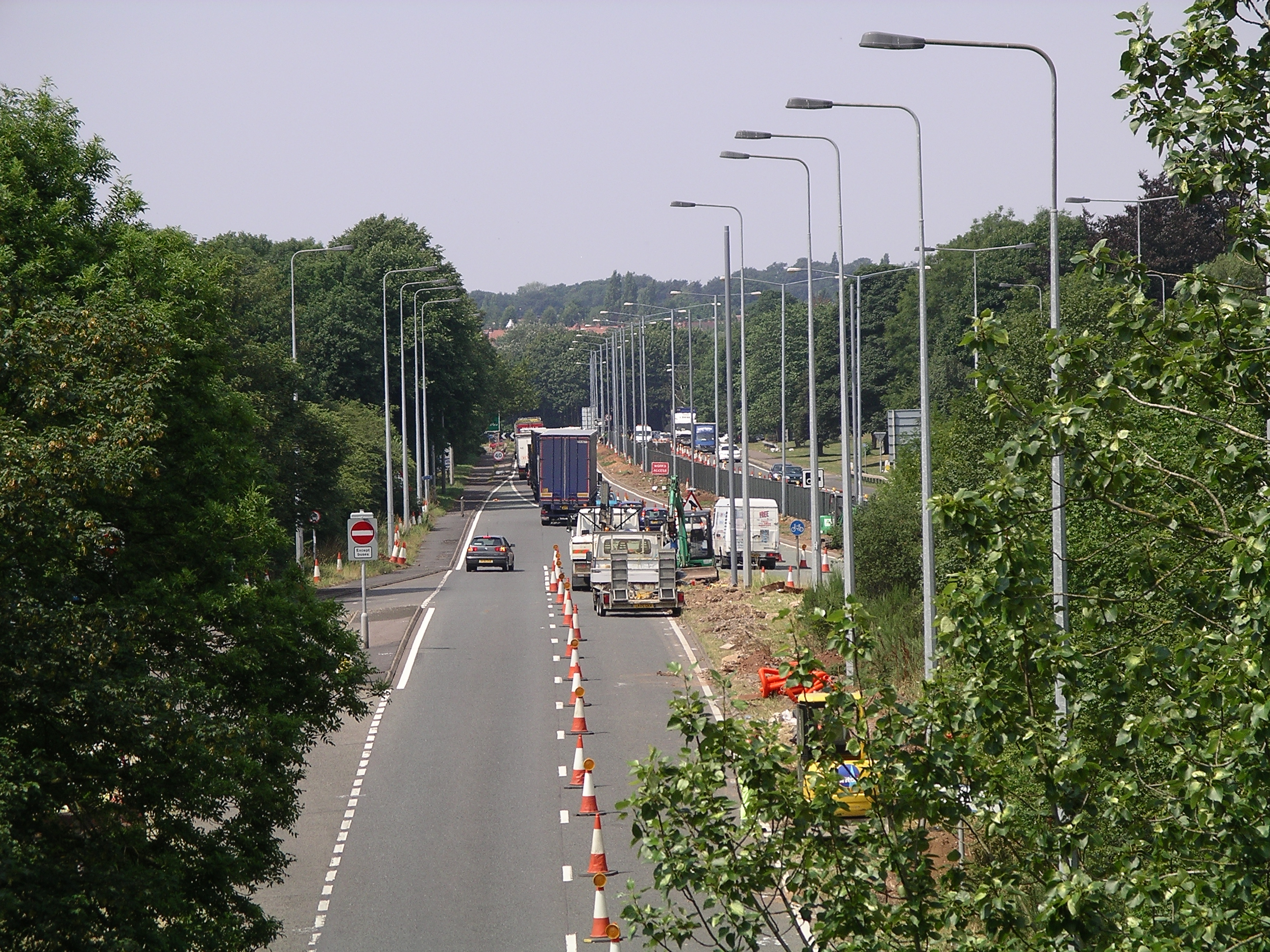
Traffic cones on the A45 in South Coventry, UK

Typically, a worksite will be set up with warning signage well in advance of the actual work area. This may involve (in Australia) "Roadworks Ahead", temporary speed restrictions, "Worker Symbolic" (a stylized workman with a pile of rubble, black silhouette on a retroflective orange background), "Reduce Speed", "Lane Status" boards (indicating that some lanes on a multilane roadway will be closed), "Prepare to Stop" and advisory signs telling what is happening (e.g. Water Over Road, Trucks Entering, and Power Line Works Ahead). If lanes have been closed, large flashing arrows (Arrow Boards) on trailers or specialized vehicles may be utilized to give motorists warning to move over. Motorists will be advised they are leaving a worksite by speed reinstatement and a "End Roadworks" signs.

The worksite will usually involve closing a part of the road for the work area. How this is done depends on the type of road: on a multi-lane road, one or more lanes will be closed off and traffic merged into the remaining lane(s), using cones and "Chevron" signs and Arrow Boards to guide motorists. On a wide road (more than 3 meters per lane in Australia), traffic could be "diverted" around the work area by using cones to define a new road centerline and another line of cones around the work area to create what is called a contraflow. Sometimes, it is necessary to close a road and detour traffic.

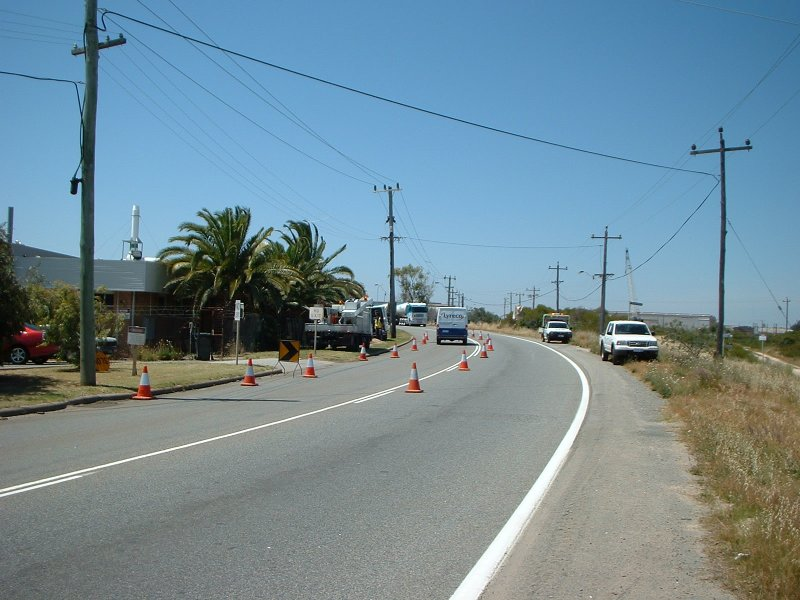
Traffic diverted around work area in Kwinana, Western Australia

Often, the road is not wide enough to permit opposing streams of traffic past the work area. Then it is necessary to use traffic controllers holding "Stop/Slow" Paddles or Bats to enact shuttle flow operations, where each stream is allowed past the work area in turn. For works in high-speed or dangerous areas (decided by the local governing body) portable traffic lights or boom-gates may be used to remove the traffic controller from the danger of being struck by a car. At signalised intersections, it may be necessary to have the traffic lights disabled. When this occurs, police are deployed to control the intersection.

Sometimes on dual carriageways, it is necessary to divert one carriageway onto the opposing carriageway, forming a "contraflow". This cannot be done "on the fly", as high-speed (100-plus km/h), high-volume (500–1,000+ vehicles per hour) traffic is involved, generating a huge risk to workers. In this case advisory signs will be erected weeks or even months in advance, and new lanes defined by bollards anchored firmly to the road-base will be installed, usually at night when traffic is expected to be minimal. Programmable Variable Message Signs may be utilized at strategic locations to inform motorists.

== By country ==
=== Australia ===
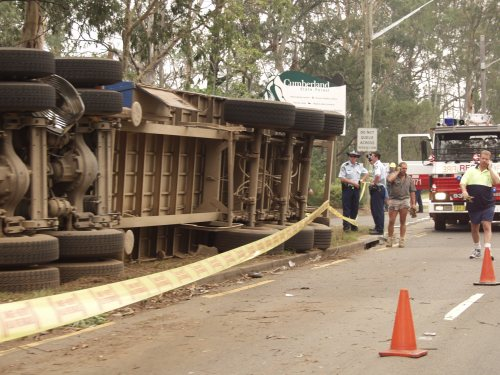
Traffic cones placed around a rollover accident in Sydney

Traffic control is governed by the Australian Standard AS 1742.3 – 2009, and by State variations. Risk management is regulated under AS/NZS 4360:1999. Traffic controllers are required to wear high-visibility clothing which meets the Australian Standard AS/NZS 4602:1999.

Personal safety is emphasised in all Australian training. This ranges from proper clothing to learning appropriate behaviour (for example, always face oncoming traffic). Clothing is considered part of PPE—personal protective equipment—which includes steel-capped boots, sunscreen, broad-brim hats, gloves and sunglasses.

The traffic control process usually starts with a traffic control plan. A traffic control crew may consist of one person running a simple diversion or closure of a cul-de-sac, up to multiple two- or three-person crews for a complex task. One example of such a complex task is the transport of very wide loads taking all available roadspace, over several kilometers, usually on an arterial road or highway. In these cases, the affected roads can be closed or contraflowed for the entire day, creating enormous disruption to motorists. Management of the event involves monitoring and closing all intersections, Stop/Slow to work traffic streams through partially closed intersections, and detours. The amount of signage required can be staggering, needing some hours to put in place. Normally a single two-person crew with one ute is sufficient for most jobs.

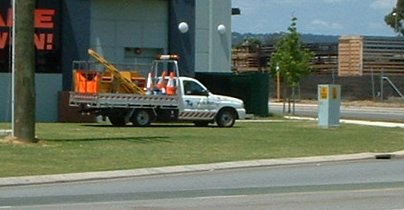
Traffic control ute at worksite

Not all TCs are employed by dedicated traffic management companies. Many construction companies and government authorities employ their own traffic management. In these cases, TCs will work in other capacities when traffic management is not required.

Traffic control is generally not seen as a career for young people, but rather as a stop-gap while something better is sought. However, older people are often valued by employers for their life experience, and find that the relatively light manual labour compensates for the discomforts and rigours of the job. There is a career path, but it is dictated by one's own ability and willingness to work.

==== Western Australia ====
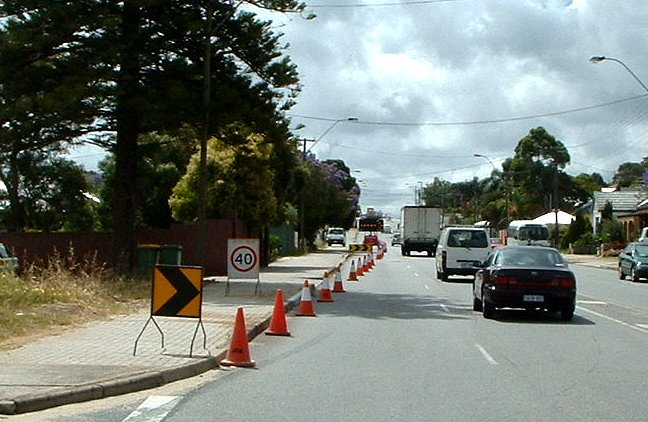
Cone taper for a "slow lane" closure showing small chevron (shifter), 40 km/h repeater, chevron and arrow-board

Accreditation course standards and variations to the Australian Standards are regulated by Main Roads Western Australia (MRWA), part of the Ministry of Planning and Infrastructure.

In Western Australia, use of the Stop/Slow bat is authorised under Regulation 83 of the Road Traffic Code 2000—it is an offence to disobey a traffic controller's bat, punishable by 3 demerit points and 3 penalty units (about A$175). Other States have similar provisions.

Traffic controllers must be accredited in Basic Worksite Traffic Management BCC3028A and the Worksite Traffic Controller Course BCC1014A. These qualifications must be renewed after three years, and a refresher course is necessary. The courses take about 4 hours each, and are designed as inductions to on-the-job training.

The Advanced Worksite Traffic Management (AWTM) requires two years' experience as a qualified TC as a minimum prerequisite, and must also be renewed after three years. Roadworks Traffic Managers can be accredited with a minimum of five years' experience, current "Road Safety Auditor" accreditation and current AWTM accreditation. This qualification is also valid for three years.

All employers require drug screening at least annually and often randomly, and many others require daily blood/alcohol tests; some require police clearance checks. Zero tolerance is universal. Traffic controllers are usually employed on a casual basis, with wages around A$28 to A$35 per hour.

=== Canada ===
==== British Columbia ====
In British Columbia, WorkSafeBC regulates the training of Traffic Control Persons (TCPs), stating that TCPs must be trained in a manner acceptable to the Board. This ensures a high level of training for this high-risk occupation. Currently, the only acceptable course in the province is a two-day session which includes theory and practical components. Royal Canadian Mounted Police (RCMP) Superintendent Derek Cooke of Langley believes that the RCMP should not perform the function of road traffic control to cater to events in support of for-profit corporations unless the municipal government has coordinated or is in support of the event. To work on BC highways, contractor require approval from Ministry of Transportation and Transit (MOTT) (earlier known as MoTI). MOTT reviews Traffic management plan (TMP) and Traffic control plan (TCP) as per TMM 2020.

==== Nova Scotia ====
In Nova Scotia training is regulated by the Nova Scotia Department of Public Works. There is a one-day course for TCPs and a two-day course for Temporary Workplace Signers. Signers are responsible for the setup of signs, cones etc., and making sure the setup complies with the NS Temporary Workplace Traffic Control Manual.

==== Newfoundland & Labrador (NL) ====
All flag persons—or traffic control persons (TCP)—in Newfoundland and Labrador are now required to complete a TCP training course approved by the Workplace Health, Safety and Compensation Commission.

Proper traffic control is critical for the safety of workers, drivers and the general public. Without training by a Commission approved training provider, workers are not permitted to work as a TCP on our province's roads.

The commission's Traffic Control Person (TCP) Certification Training Standard establishes criteria for TCP training providers and trainers.

TCP training providers must apply and be approved by the commission to deliver TCP certification training.

The delivery of training prepares the TCP to perform traffic control in a safe and competent manner by providing them with the knowledge and skills to work safely, consistent with industry and legislative standards.

Traffic Control Person (TCP) Certification Training has an expiry date of 3 years, upon which the course must be completed again for renewal.

=== United Kingdom ===
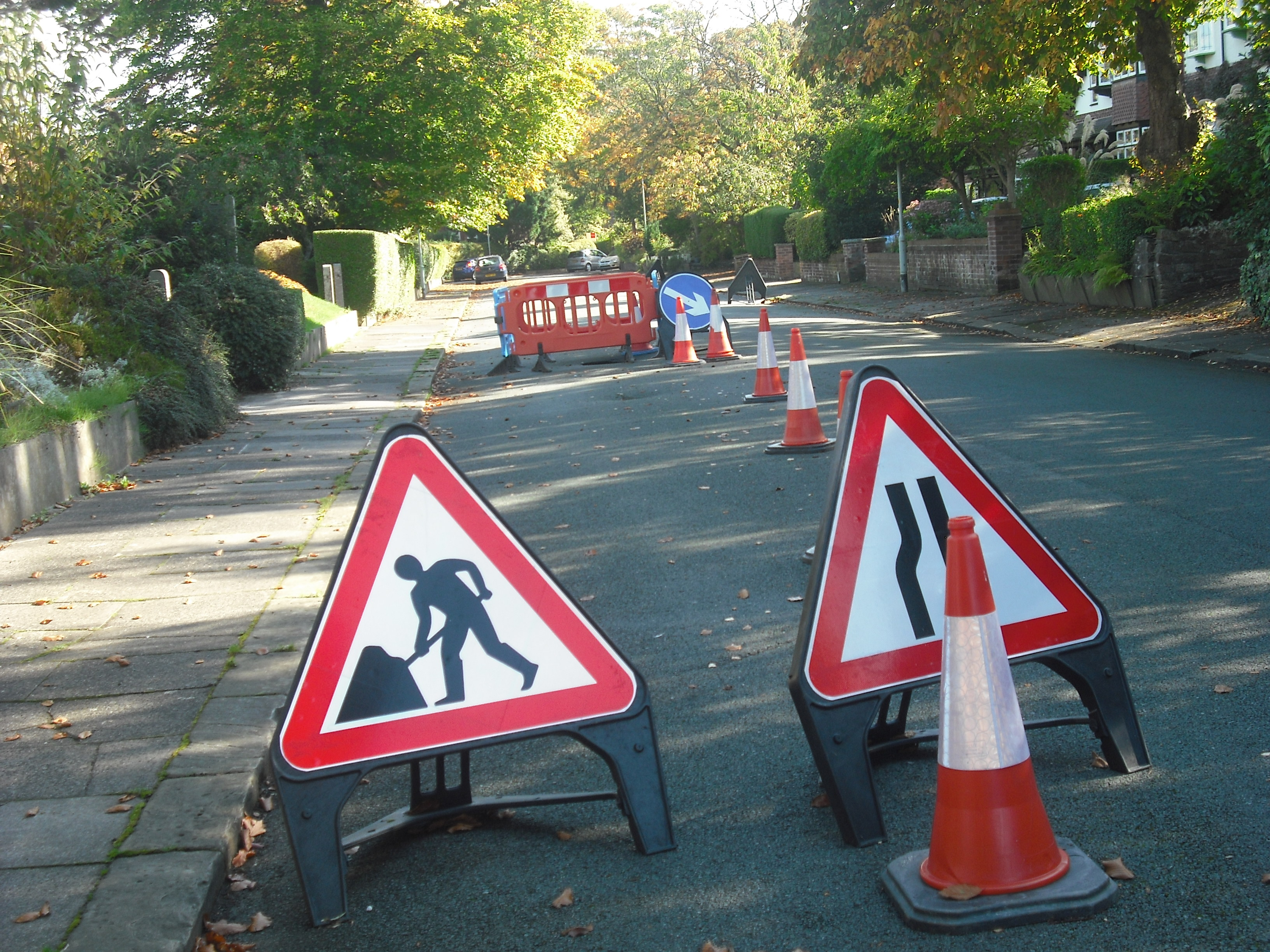
A small traffic control scheme on a residential UK street

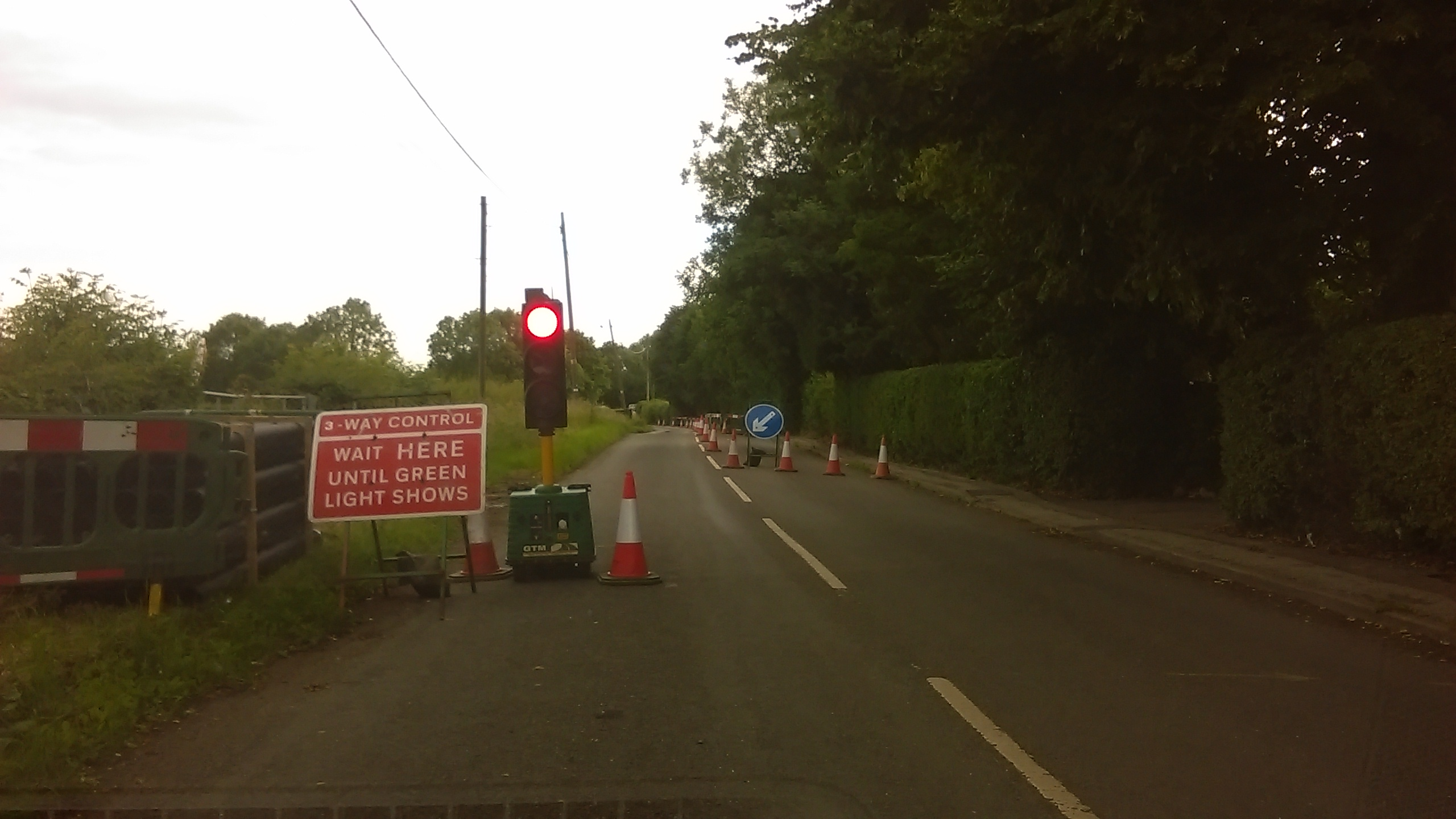
3-way control temporary traffic lights

Traffic management in the UK is overseen by the Department for Transport but each country within the union has their own transport regulator. The four countries within the UK adhere to the same standards for most traffic control and temporary modifications to traffic and pedestrian control, such as street works and road works (sometimes referred to as the "Red Book"): Safety at Street Works and Road Works – A Code of Practice. Before permission for non-police temporary traffic control (beyond emergency closure) is given, a Traffic Management Plan must be submitted to the local planning office of the affected district.

A road may have a high-visibility jacket wearing traffic controller, a Crossing Guard (colloquially a "lollipop man" or "lollipop woman") who aids children in crossing on their journey to school or a Stop / Go Marshall, (Traffic Guard) at temporary road works.

England and Wales

Responsibility is with the Department for Transport. The code of practice for street and road works is issued by the Secretary of State for Transport and Welsh Ministers under Section 65 of the New Roads and Street Works Act 1991 (NRSWA) and section 174 of the Highways Act 1980.

Scotland

Traffic management in Scotland is handled by Traffic Scotland and Transport Scotland. The code of practice for Street and Road works is issued by the Scottish ministers under section 124 of the NRSWA.

Northern Ireland

Responsibility is with the Department for Infrastructure.

- The code of practice for Street and Road works is issued by the Department for Infrastructure under Article 25 of the Street Works (Northern Ireland) Order 1995 and Article 31 of the Road Traffic Regulation Order (Northern Ireland) 1997.

=== United States ===
The American Association of State Highway and Transportation Officials (AASHTO) is a standards setting body which publishes specifications, test protocols and guidelines which are used in highway design and construction throughout the United States. Despite its name, the association represents not only highways but air, rail, water, and public transportation as well

Although the Federal Highway Administration specifies standards and guidelines through the MUTCD which apply to the usage of traffic control equipment, individual state and local agencies often provide additions or slight variations to these standards.

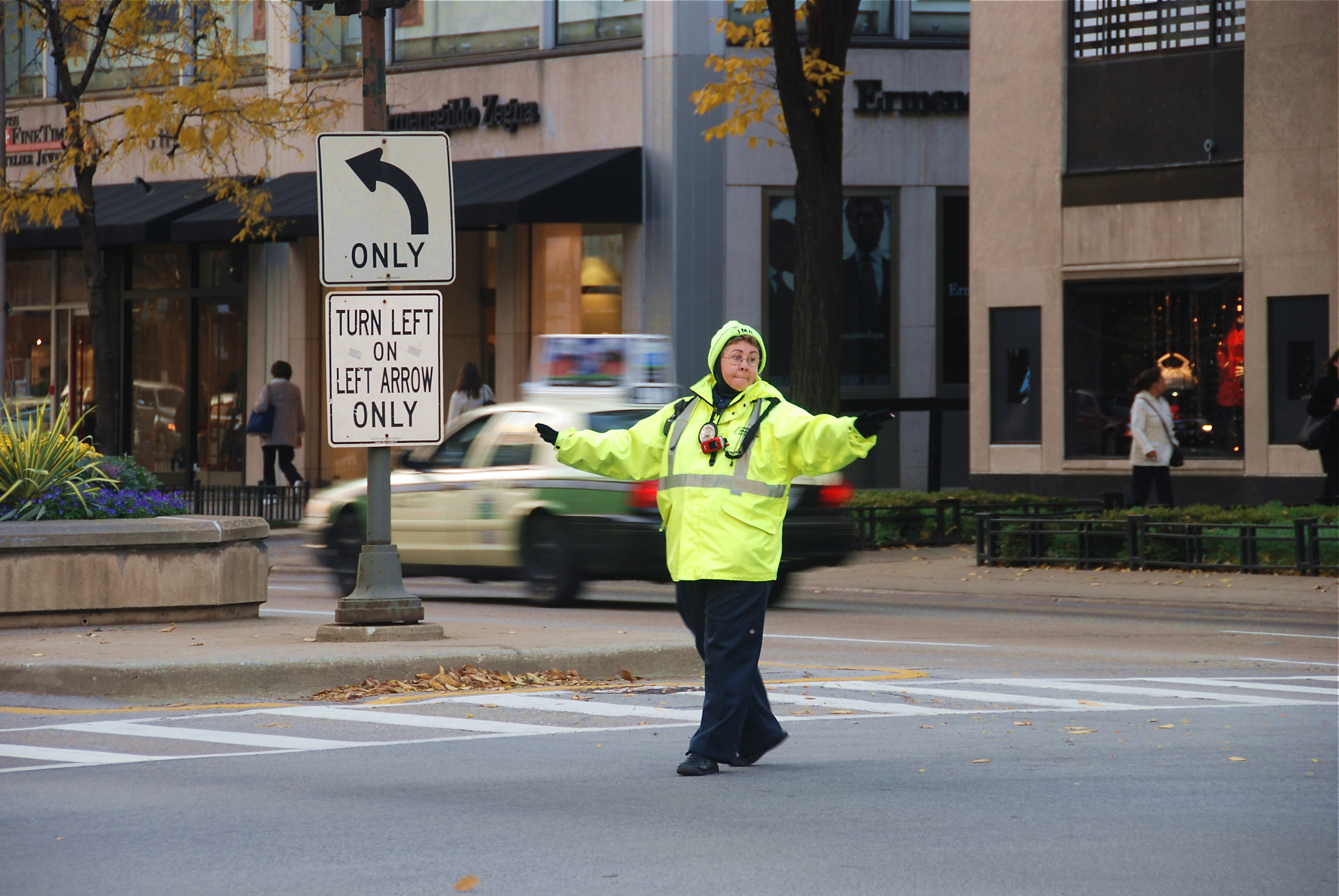
Traffic controller on Michigan Avenue, Chicago

The transportation system in the United States is complex and extensive. Traffic volumes, types of vehicles, driving styles, population density, speed limits, and many other factors vary dramatically from one region to the next. As a result, highway traffic control measures (including type of equipment and implementation), are not strictly consistent. Federal Guidelines do not address certification methods for traffic controllers, flaggers, or other personnel responsible for traffic control. This responsibility is managed on a state or local agency level, and therefore certification requirements are not consistent and are administered locally. Safety standards (irrespective of traffic control) are mandated by OSHA as well as state-level occupational safety departments.

A construction traffic control company operates in the same basic way as any other construction company. Companies submit a bid for a job, the lowest bid is accepted (except in the case of disadvantaged companies), and the labor is provided to the contractor or agency in charge. Typically speaking, flaggers work in groups of 5 to 10 under a TCS, or Traffic Control Supervisor. The TCS is responsible for placing the flaggers correctly, ensuring that they receive the proper breaks and supervision, and placing the advance warning signs (such as Road Work Ahead, One Lane Road Ahead, and Uneven Lanes). Flaggers are the second line of attention (after the warning signs) for drivers. They are the first people in the work zone to deal with opposing traffic.

While construction traffic control in the U.S. used to be a widely unionized profession, it is now dominated by private business and wages are not controlled by the union.

Some road traffic control systems have started to optimize multiple traffic modes, including vehicles and pedestrians.

== See also ==
- Quality assurance
- Quality control
- Road traffic control device
- Road traffic safety
- Traffic guard
