= Mobile infrared transmitter =

Traffic light override device

A mobile infrared transmitter (MIRT) is an electronic traffic preemption device that city buses and emergency vehicles use to control the traffic control equipment for intersections they are approaching, in order to pass through the intersection as efficiently or safely as possible.

== Description ==
An MIRT device consists of a timer circuit connected to an infrared LED array. The timer causes the infrared LEDs to strobe at specific frequencies, such as 10Hz for low priority (buses) or 14 Hz for high priority (emergency vehicles). Low priority transmitters will control the intersection to perform a normal light change, while high priority transmitters will change an entire intersection immediately.

== Usage restrictions ==
Certain cities use specially encoded infrared pulses to prevent the use of home made transmitters.

People buying and selling the devices were stopped in August 2005 when President George W. Bush passed the Safe, Accountable, Flexible, Efficient Transportation Equity Act.

It established a minimum sentence of six months in prison for anyone who uses the device illegally. The act also said those selling the device illegally could serve a year in prison, according to the U.S. Department of Transportation web site.

== Security concerns ==
Unauthorized devices present security concerns because they communicate directly with traffic signal priority systems using infrared signals, potentially trigger traffic signal preemption or priority, altering normal signal timing. This possibility is sometimes discussed in analyses of intelligent transportation system security as an example of how physical signaling mechanisms could be misused to manipulate traffic flow.

== See also ==
- Traffic signal preemption
