= Turnpike =

Turnpike often refers to:

- A type of gate, another word for a turnstile
- In the US, a toll road

Turnpike may also refer to:

== Roads ==
=== United Kingdom ===
- A turnpike road, a principal road maintained by a turnpike trust that collected road tolls in Britain in the 17th–19th centuries
- Turnpike Lane, Haringey, London, England, a street
- Keighley and Kendal Turnpike, Yorkshire, England. 1753–1878

=== United States ===
- Connecticut Turnpike, a former toll road in Connecticut, US It was opened to the public free of charge in 1985
- Delaware Turnpike, a toll road in Delaware, US
- Florida's Turnpike, a toll road in Florida, US
  - Homestead Extension of Florida's Turnpike, a toll road in Florida, US (part of Florida's Turnpike)
- Indiana Toll Road, a toll road in Indiana, US (often called "the Indiana Turnpike")
- Kansas Turnpike, a toll road in Kansas, US
- Kentucky Turnpike, a former toll road in Kentucky, US
- Maine Turnpike, a toll road in Maine, US
- Massachusetts Turnpike, a toll road in Massachusetts, US
- Turnpikes in New Hampshire, United States
  - Everett Turnpike, a toll road in central New Hampshire (built prior to the inception of the Interstate Highway System)
  - Blue Star Turnpike (also known as the New Hampshire Turnpike), a toll road entirely in Rockingham County, New Hampshire, with its entire route concurrent with the NH portion of Interstate 95
  - Spaulding Turnpike, a toll road in eastern New Hampshire
- New Jersey Turnpike, a toll road in New Jersey, US
- Ohio Turnpike, a toll road in Ohio, US
- Turnpikes of Oklahoma, a turnpike system in Oklahoma, US
- Pennsylvania Turnpike, a toll road in Pennsylvania, US
- Tennessee State Route 240
- President George Bush Turnpike, a toll road in Texas, US
- West Virginia Turnpike, a toll road in West Virginia, US

== Places ==
- Turnpike Stadium, the former name of Arlington Stadium in Arlington, Texas, US
- Turnpike Esker, name of a Mi'kmaw portage trail in Digby County, Nova Scotia, Canada

== Other uses ==
- Turnpike (ride), a former amusement ride at Kennywood in Pittsburgh, Pennsylvania, US
- Turnpike (software), an Internet software suite for Microsoft Windows
- Turnpike stair, the common name of a spiral staircase in Scottish architecture
- Turnpike theory, an economic theory deriving from the concept of the toll road being the fastest route between two points
- Turnpike Troubadours, a country band from Oklahoma, US
- Mercury Turnpike Cruiser, a flagship model for the Mercury automotive division
