= Junctions (software) =

- A double roundabout assessment in Junctions 9
- Developer(s): Transport Research Laboratory
- Stable release: 10.1.0 / August 2, 2023; 20 months ago
- Operating system: Windows
- Type: Traffic software
- License: Proprietary software
- Website: https://trlsoftware.com/

Junctions is a software package by Transport Research Laboratory. It incorporates the previously separate programs ARCADY, PICADY and OSCADY. The latest version, Junctions 10, was launched on 3 February 2021.

== ARCADY ==
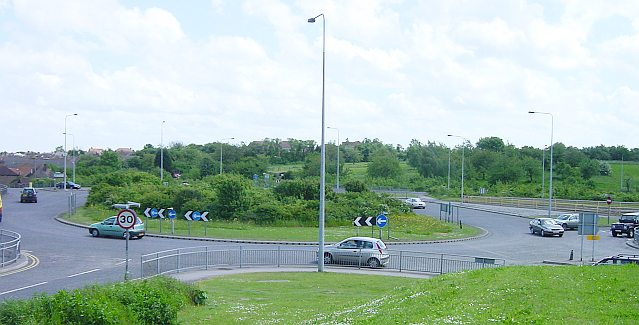
ARCADY is used to assess roundabout designs. Circulating traffic has priority over traffic entering from the approach roads.

ARCADY (Assessment of Roundabout Capacity And DelaY) models traffic capacity, queues, and delays at roundabouts. The software is largely based on empirical relationships between roundabout geometry and capacity, which were established as the result of extensive research carried out on existing roundabouts on the UK road network, as well as controlled test track facilities.

The program is used by traffic engineers when assessing existing layouts or when analysing the impacts of proposed design changes. Estimates of annual accident frequencies can also be obtained. The key outputs are the Ratio of Flow to Capacity, the queue length, and delay time.

The capacity and safety relationships that ARCADY utilizes are discussed in the UK's Design Manual for Roads and Bridges.

RODEL is similar to ARCADY.

=== Recent developments ===
From ARCADY 7 onwards, the software has been capable of communicating with certain CAD software, aiding real-time design analysis. ARCADY 7 introduced the ability to model simple networks of linked roundabouts.

In ARCADY 8, the Highway Capacity Manual 2010 methodology for roundabout analysis was made available. ARCADY 8 also introduced a simulation technique to deal with the modelling of certain configurations, such as lane usage at roundabouts.

'ARCADY Lite' is a simplified version of ARCADY 8 that provides basic analysis of roundabouts.

ARCADY 9 includes built-in tools for graphically measuring roundabout geometries and for assisting with the transfer of traffic flow data from other sources (typically spreadsheets).

ARCADY 10 is now fully integrated and available as a module within Junctions. Updates include a number of new modelling scenarios to be evaluated, such as priority chicanes and one-ways. North American users also have the option of using the HCM 2010 model (using HCM 2016 roundabout coefficients) to analyse roundabout designs.

== PICADY ==
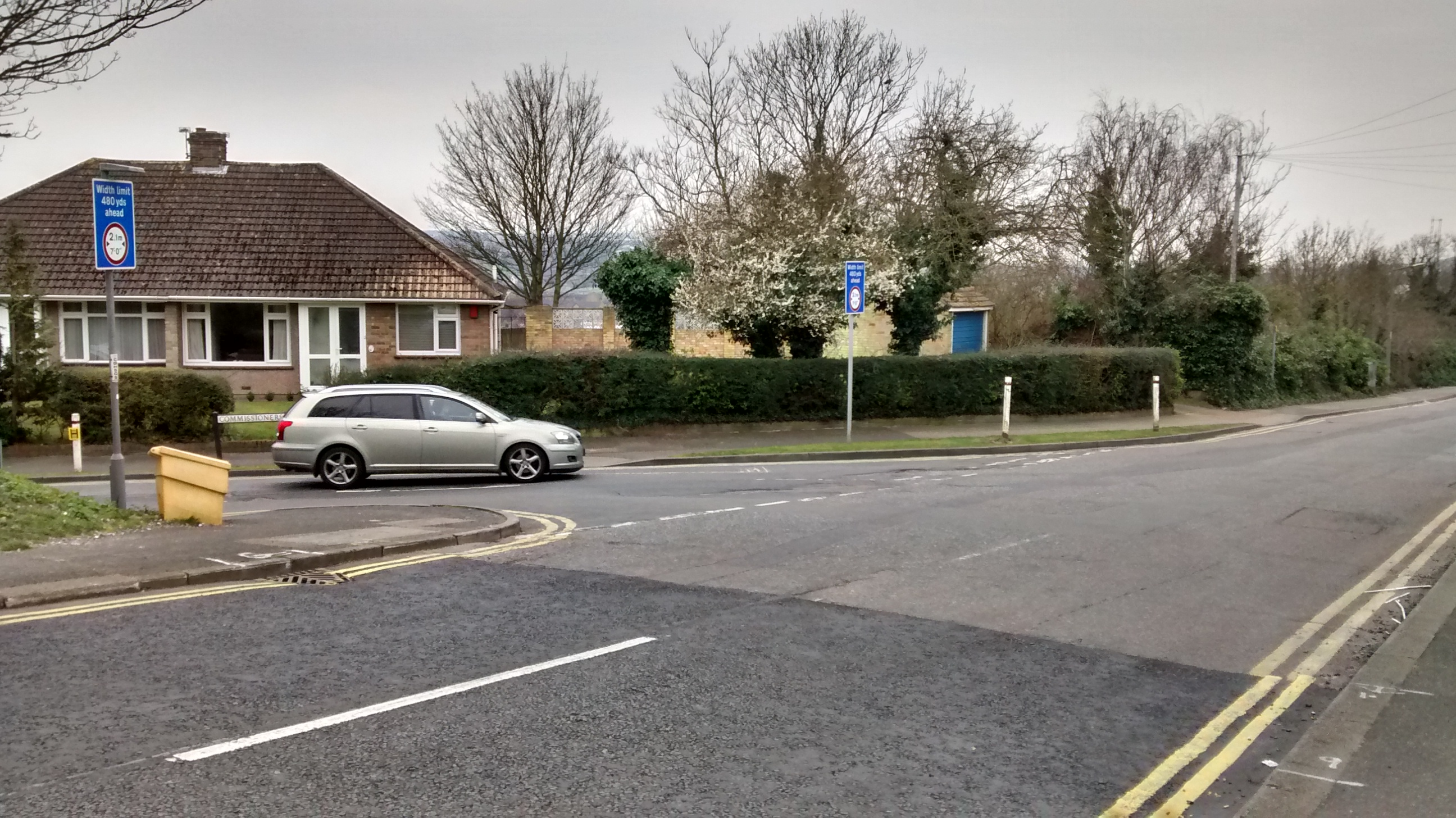
PICADY is used to assess priority junction designs such as this T-junction. There are no signals here so right of way is determined by the road markings. The double-dashed line indicates that the grey car should give way to any oncoming traffic.

PICADY (Priority Intersection Capacity and Delay) is a program for modelling three and four arm priority junctions in a similar manner to ARCADY. It is based on empirical relationships which link capacity and safety with road geometric parameters such as carriageway widths and visibilities. These relationships are discussed in the UK Design Manual for Roads and Bridges. As for ARCADY, the key outputs are the Ratio of Flow to Capacity, the queue length and delay time.

PICADY can also model pedestrian crossings on the approaches to priority junctions.

PICADY 5 can model the following junction forms:

- T-junction (3 arms)
- Straight crossroads (4 arms)
- Staggered crossroads (4 arms)

PICADY 9 includes Highway Capacity Manual 2010 models for Two-Way Stop-Controlled and All-Way Stop-Controlled intersections.

PICADY 10 offers the ability to calibrate models in all circumstances, by applying adjustments to the model’s individual traffic movement raw capacities. Models applicable to North America allow users to set up and model Two-Way Stop Controlled (TWSC) and All-Way Stop Controlled (AWSC) intersections.

== OSCADY ==
OSCADY (Optimized Signal Capacity and Delay) calculates and simulates capacities, queues and delays for isolated (uncoordinated), traffic signal-controlled junctions. It can evaluate a set of known signal timings, and optionally it can optimize stage lengths and/or cycle time to minimize delay. These functions are similar to LinSig. More recently, an extension to the simulation mode allows the performance of simple adaptive signal control to be estimated.

OSCADY is intended to be used at relatively simple signalized junctions (or temporary signals at road works) where the emphasis is on setting up model runs quickly and easily, but can model junctions that include flared approaches and opposed right turns. Its integration with ARCADY and PICADY means that users can switch a junction between priority and signalized options and compare the results within one package.

Optionally, signalized junctions can be evaluated in Lane Simulation mode which offers additional functionality, such as the ability to model intermittent stages and partially signalized junctions, including signalized roundabouts. In Junctions 10 the simulation mode capability has been extended to allow the performance of simple adaptive signal control to be estimated. This model can be applied to temporary signals (such as at roadworks) and some control over the controller logic is provided in order to mimic behaviour whenever there is no demand at any point within the modelled time period.

== See also ==
- Sidra Intersection
