= TRANSYT =

Traffic engineering software

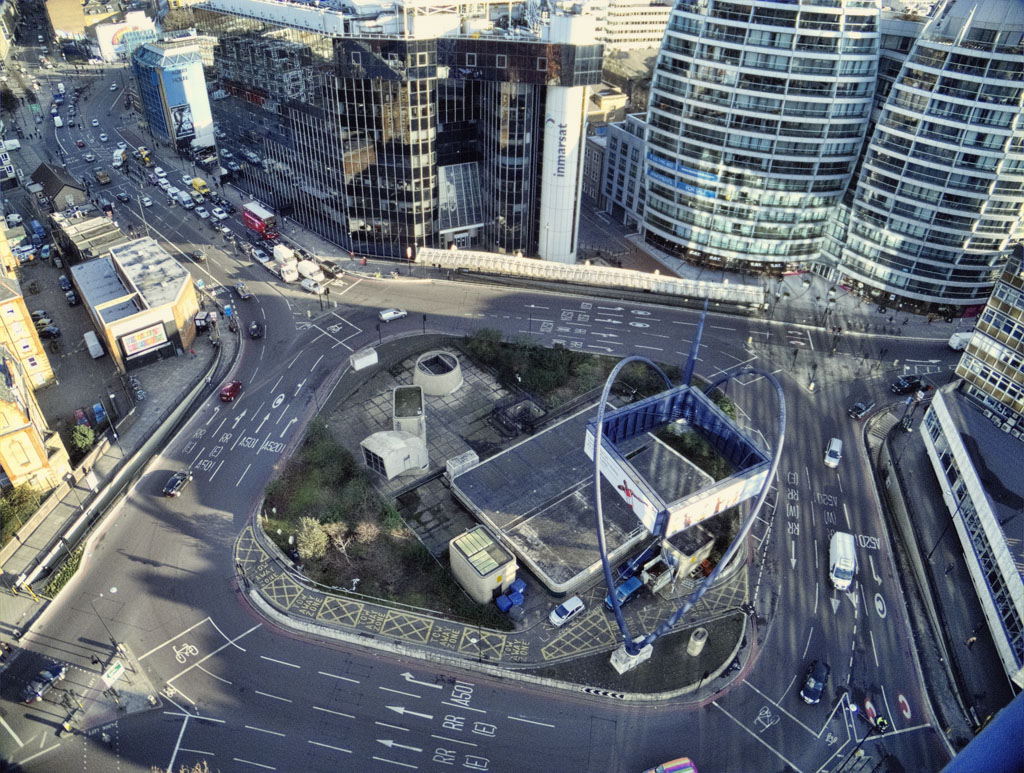
Signalised roundabouts can be modelled using TRANSYT.

TRANSYT (TRAffic Network StudY Tool) is traffic engineering software developed by the Transport Research Laboratory. It is used to model signalised highway networks and has the ability to model platooning.

The current release is version 16.

== Method ==
The user inputs saturation flows and observed traffic flows on the relevant highway links which are controlled by signals. TRANSYT then optimises the green time for each signal to minimise the overall number of stops and delay time.

== Worldwide use ==
The software was developed in the UK and the first version was released in 1967. It has been adapted for use in other countries, including Chile, where TRANSYT 8S was used from the late 1980s to improve traffic flow in the capital, Santiago.

In the US, the Federal Highway Administration adapted the product into TRANSYT-7F.

== Other software ==
TRANSYT's main competitor is LINSIG.
