= Smart traffic light =

Vehicle traffic control system

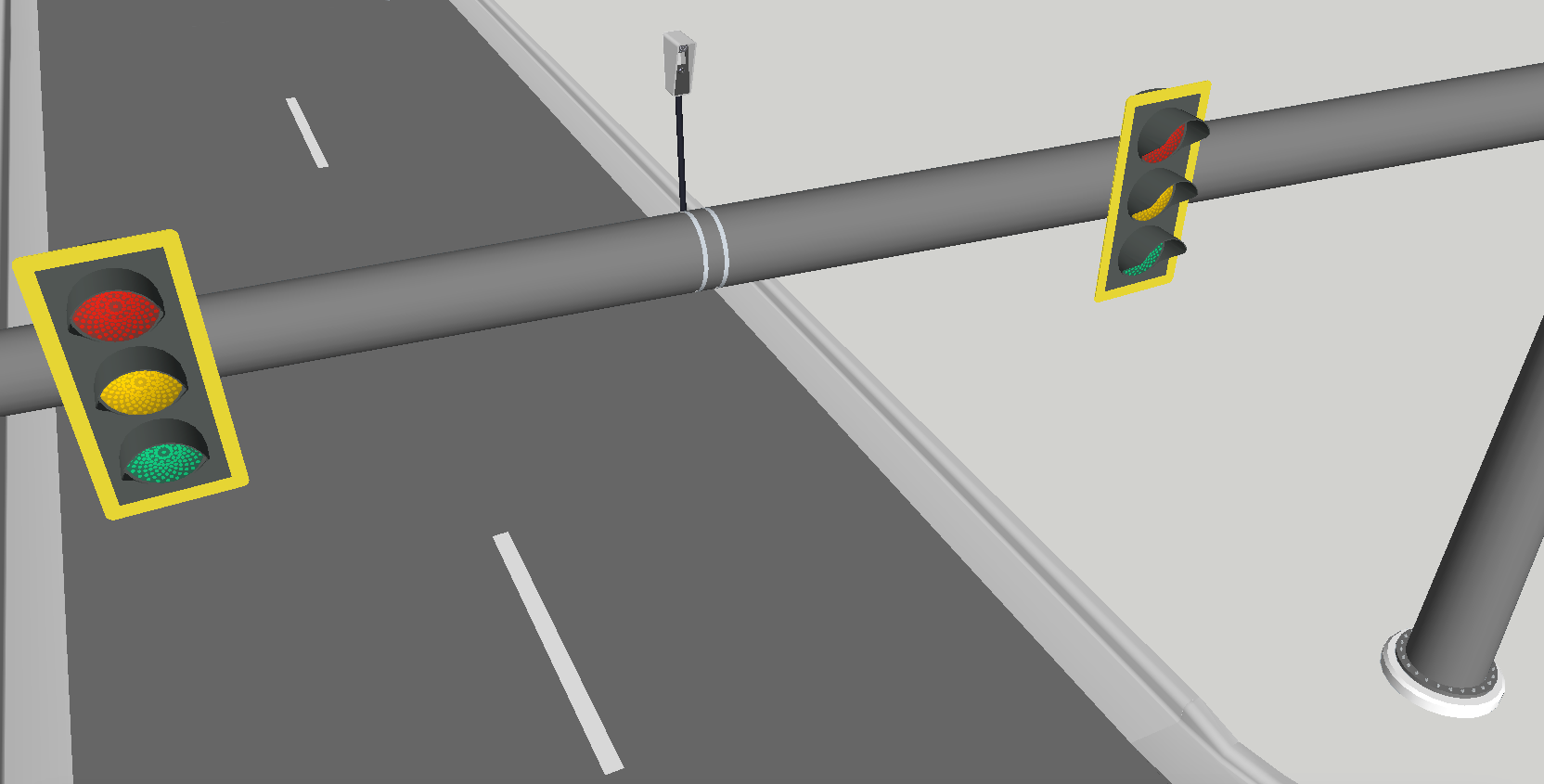
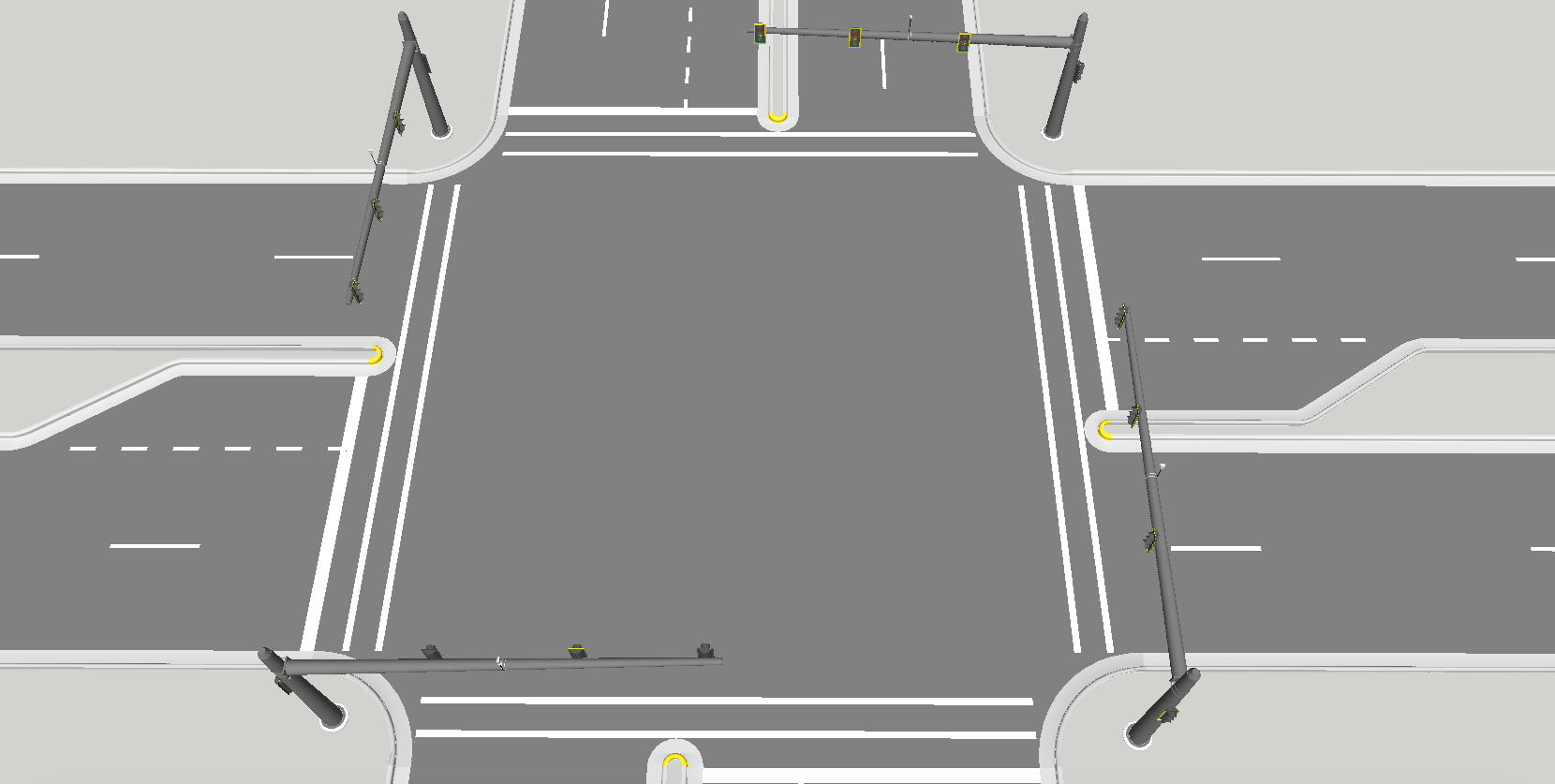
Artificially intelligent traffic lights use cameras with radar, ultrasonic acoustic location sensors, and predictive algorithms to improve traffic flow

Smart traffic lights or Intelligent traffic lights are a vehicle traffic control system that combine traditional traffic lights with an array of sensors and artificial intelligence to intelligently route vehicle and pedestrian traffic. They can form part of a bigger intelligent transport system.

== Research ==
A technology for smart traffic signals has been developed at Carnegie Mellon University and is being used in a pilot project in Pittsburgh in an effort to reduce vehicle emissions in the city. Unlike other dynamic control signals that adjust the timing and phasing of lights according to limits that are set in controller programming, this system combines existing technology with artificial intelligence.

The signals communicate with each other and adapt to changing traffic conditions to reduce the amount of time that cars spend idling. Using fiber optic video receivers similar to those already employed in dynamic control systems, the new technology monitors vehicle numbers and makes changes in real time to avoid congestion wherever possible. Initial results from the pilot study are encouraging: the amount of time that motorists spent idling at lights was reduced by 40% and travel times across the city were reduced by 25%.

== Possible benefits ==
Companies involved in developing smart traffic management systems include BMW and Siemens, who unveiled their system of networked lights in 2010. This system works with the anti-idling technology that many cars are equipped with, to warn them of impending light changes. This should help cars that feature anti-idling systems to use them more intelligently, and the information that networks receive from the cars should help them to adjust light cycling times to make them more efficient.

A new patent appearing March 1, 2016 by John F. Hart Jr. is for a "Smart" traffic control system that "sees" traffic approaching the intersections and reacts according to what is needed to keep the flow of vehicles at the most efficient rate. By anticipating the needs of the approaching vehicles, as opposed to reacting to them after they arrive and stop, this system has the potential to save motorist time while cutting down harmful emissions.

Romanian and US research teams believe that the time spent by motorists waiting for lights to change could be reduced by over 28% with the introduction of smart traffic lights, and that CO_{2} emissions could be cut by as much as 6.5%.

A major use of Smart traffic lights could be as part of public transport systems. The signals can be set up to sense the approach of buses or trams and change the signals in their favour, thus improving the speed and efficiency of sustainable transport modes.

== Obstacles to widespread introduction ==
The main stumbling block to the widespread introduction of such systems is the fact that most vehicles on the road are unable to communicate with the computer systems that town and city authorities use to control traffic lights. However, the trial in Harris County, Texas, referred to above, uses a simple system based on signals received from drivers' cell phones, and it has found that even if only a few drivers have their phone switched on, the system is still able to produce reliable data on traffic density. This means that the adoption of smart traffic lights around the world could be started as soon as a reasonable minority of vehicles were fitted with the technology to communicate with the computers that control the signals, rather than having to wait until the majority of cars had such technology.

== The first experiment ==
In July 2019 the first experiment of a traffic signal regulated by 100% "connected" vehicles was carried on at University of Calabria (Unical) with the help of common commercial smart phones by a team of researchers working for Unical and the innovative Start Up SOMOS.

== Simpler systems ==
In the United Kingdom, lights that changed to red when sensing that an approaching motorist was traveling too fast were being trialled in Swindon in 2011, to see if they are more effective at reducing the number of accidents on the road than the speed cameras that preceded them and which were removed following a council decision in 2008. These lights are more focused on encouraging motorists to obey the law but if they prove to be a success then they could pave the way for more sophisticated systems to be introduced in the UK.

== Previous research ==
In addition to the findings of the Romanian and US researchers mentioned above, scientists in Dresden, Germany came to the conclusion that smart traffic lights could handle their task more efficiently without human interface.

== See also ==
- Traffic light control and coordination
- Level crossing
- Pedestrian crossing
- Scalable Urban Traffic Control
- Traffic optimization
