= Degree of saturation =

Topics referred to by the same term

Degree of saturation may refer to:

- Degree of saturation (earth sciences), a ratio of liquid to the total volume of voids in a porous material
- Degree of saturation (traffic), a measure used in traffic engineering

== See also ==
- Degree of unsaturation, formula is used in organic chemistry
