= Traffic light control and coordination =

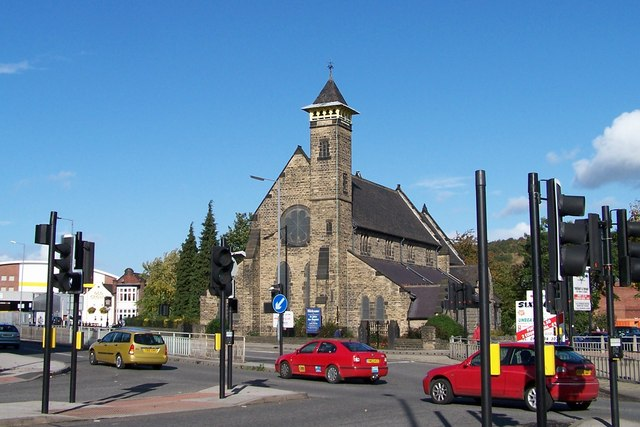
A junction for road vehicles and pedestrians controlled by traffic lights in the UK. The various vehicle and pedestrian movements are separated in either time or space for safety and efficiency.

The normal function of traffic lights requires more than sight control and coordination to ensure that traffic and pedestrians move as smoothly and safely as possible. A variety of control systems are used to accomplish this, ranging from simple clockwork mechanisms to sophisticated computerized control and coordination systems that self-adjust to minimize delays for people using the junction.

In the United States, traffic signal timing is traditionally operated to minimize vehicle delay at traffic signals. This often affects the safety and mobility of people walking and riding bicycles.

== History ==
The first automated system for controlling traffic signals was developed by inventors Leonard Casciato and Josef Kates and was used in Toronto in 1954.

== Terminology ==
In Australia and New Zealand, the terminology is different. A "phase" is a period of time during which a set of traffic movements receives a green signal, equivalent to the concept of a "stage" in the UK. One electrical output from the traffic signal controller is called a "signal group" - similar to the UK's concept of "phase". PTV VISSIM also uses the signal group terminology.

Components in a traffic signal cycle in the United States.

In the United States, an "interval" is a portion of a signal cycle during which none of the signal indications change. A "phase" means the sum of right of way (green), change (yellow), and clearance (red) intervals assigned to an independent or combined traffic movement.

== Phases ==
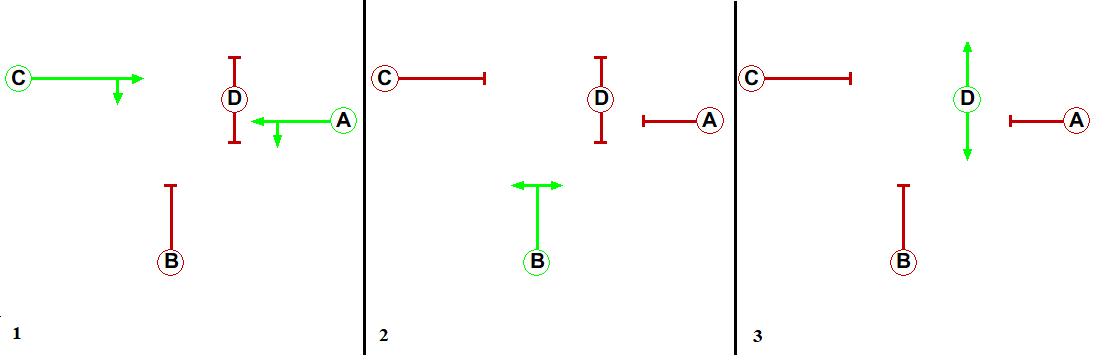
This three-arm signal controlled junction has three vehicle phases (A, B and C) and a pedestrian phase (D). The phases operate together in three stages (1, 2, and 3). Moving phases are shown in green and stopped phases are shown in red.

Phases are indications shown to traffic on traffic signal aspects (a single light on a signal head). For example, a green phase gives all traffic from a particular approach the right of way through the junction (bar turning traffic). In the UK, a filter phase allows non-conflicting traffic to make particular turns (normally left or ahead) through a junction.

A movement is any path through the junction which vehicles or pedestrians are permitted to take. A movement is conflicting if its paths cross. Normally, conflicting movements are not permitted, except for opposed right or left turns (depending on driving side) or, in some jurisdictions, pedestrians and vehicles moving in parallel directions.

== Stages and periods ==
A stage is a group of non-conflicting phases that move at the same time. For example, a crossroads with four approach arms could operate in two-stage operation, where each road is given green, or three-stage operation, where the major road is given green, then each side road is given green in turn. A cycle is one complete sequence of stages.

The interstage or intergreen period is the period between the end of a green signal in one phase and the start of a green signal in the next phase. This normally includes an amber signal on approaches as the green phase ends, and an all-red stage, where all changing signals are red to allow the junction to clear. All red stages result in lost time, during which no road users can proceed through the junction.

An interval is the period between changes in signal stages. For example, the vehicular green interval is the period during which vehicular traffic has a green signal. The interval is fixed in pre-timed control and varied in actuated control. In actuated settings, the minimum interval is the shortest time a signal will remain green before changing. This can be as low as 2 seconds for local roads, but may need to be as long as 15 seconds for arterial roads. The maximum interval is the maximum amount of time one road will be allowed a green signal, where demand is present on another road.

For pedestrians, the invitation period is the time during which they are invited to begin crossing the road. This is normally shown with a green or white male walking figure.

== Cycle time ==
The cycle time of an intersection, or set of coordinated signals, is typically the time it takes for all stages to complete, or the time from the start of the green light to the start of the next green. It tends to be longer at busier intersections and busier times of day.

Reducing cycle time can decrease delays for public transport vehicles and is particularly effective when they have their own lane or operate at high frequency.

Some jurisdictions have maximum cycle times. For example, in the UK, this is 120 seconds or 90 seconds where pedestrian facilities are present. Under actuated control, the reversion is the stage the traffic controller returns to when there is no demand. Maximum traffic signal cycle times are typical for Sydney Coordinated Adaptive Traffic System (SCATS) installations. The Sydney Coordinated Adaptive Traffic System (SCATS) includes nominal cycle times (nCL) and the 'as-run' (actual) cycle length (rCL).

=== Pedestrian safety ===
Shorter traffic signal cycle times enable shorter pedestrian wait times.

Shorter pedestrian wait times at signalised crossings reduce the likelihood of people walking on red (crossing the road against a signal), which improves safety.

== Traffic controllers ==
A traffic signal is typically controlled by a controller mounted inside a cabinet. Some electromechanical controllers are still in use (New York City still had 4,800 as of 1998, though the number is lower now due to the prevalence of the signal controller boxes). However, modern traffic controllers are solid-state. The cabinet typically contains a power panel, to distribute electrical power in the cabinet; a detector interface panel, to connect to loop detectors and other detectors; detector amplifiers; the controller itself; a conflict monitor unit; flash transfer relays; a police panel, to allow the police to turn off the signal; and other components.

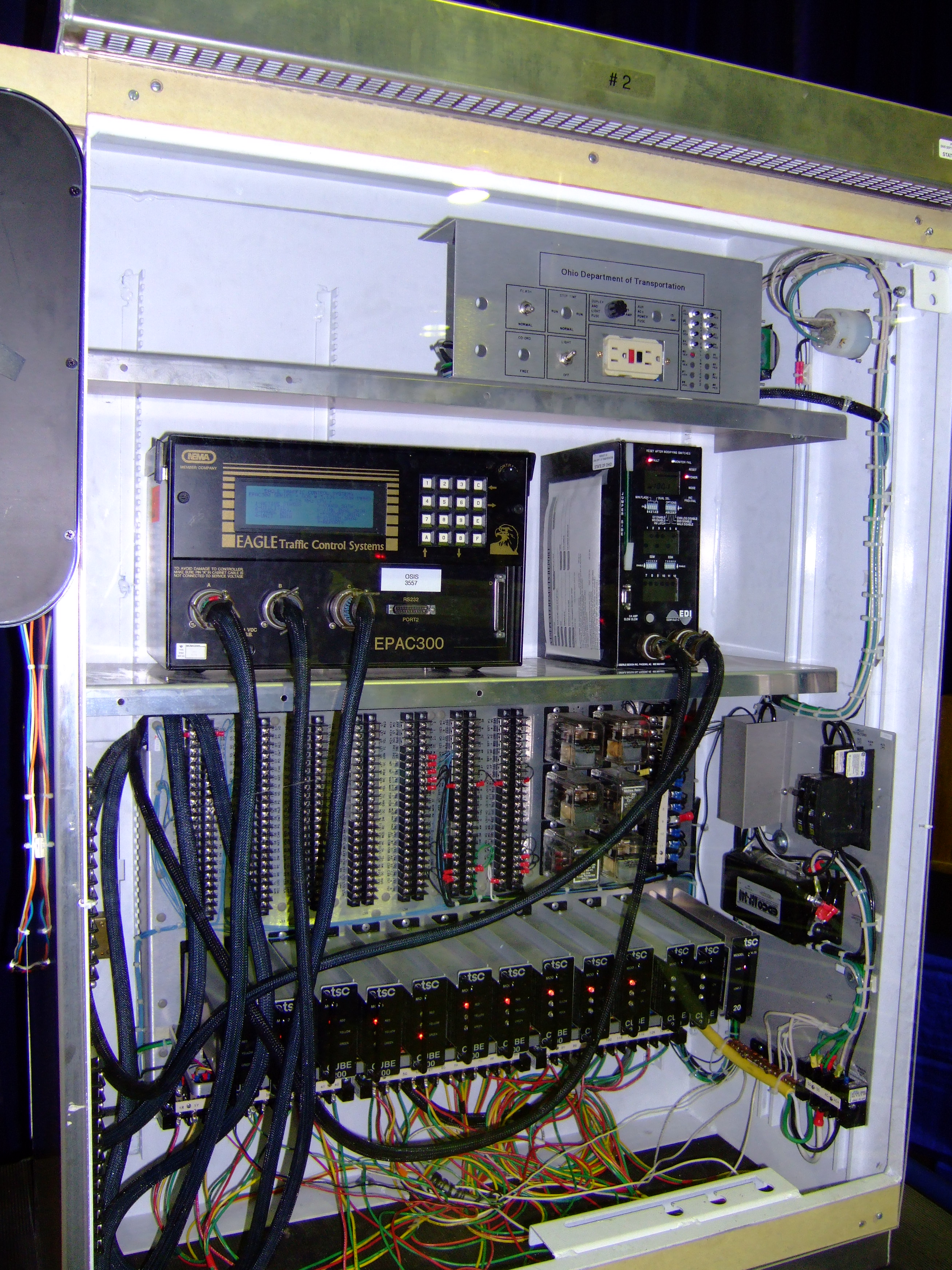
Computerized traffic control box

In the United States, controllers are standardized by the NEMA, which sets standards for connectors, operating limits, and intervals. The TS-1 standard was introduced in 1976 for the first generation of solid-state controllers.

Solid-state controllers must have an independent conflict monitor unit (CMU) to ensure fail-safe operation. The CMU monitors the controller's outputs, and if a fault is detected, it uses the flash transfer relays to put the intersection to FLASH, with all red lights flashing, rather than displaying a potentially hazardous combination of signals. The CMU is programmed with the allowable combinations of lights and will detect if the controller gives conflicting directions, for instance, green signals facing both northbound and eastbound traffic at a cross intersection. Conflict monitors are susceptible to false activation during thunderstorms due to power surges and noise induced by nearby lightning strikes.

In the late 1990s, a national standardization effort known as the advanced transportation controller (ATC) was undertaken in the United States by the Institute of Transportation Engineers. The project attempted to create a single national standard for traffic light controllers. The standardization effort is part of the National Intelligent transportation system program funded by various highway bills, starting with ISTEA in 1991, followed by TEA-21, and subsequent bills. The controllers will communicate using National Transportation Communications for ITS Protocol (NTCIP), based on Internet Protocol, ISO/OSI, and ASN.1.

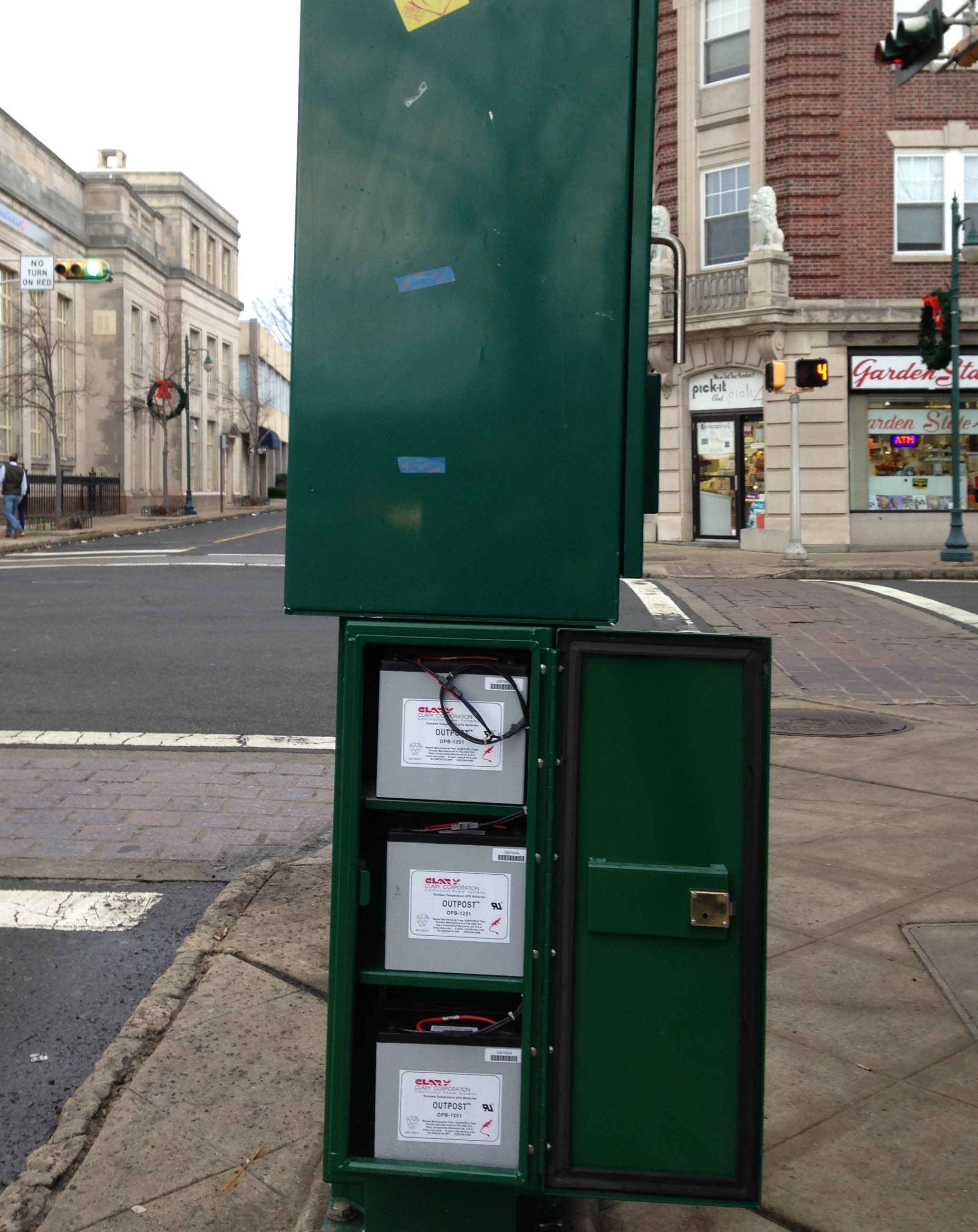
Battery backups installed in a separate cabinet from the traffic controller cabinet on the top.

Traffic lights must be instructed when to change stages, and they are usually coordinated so that stage changes occur in relation to other nearby signals, the press of a pedestrian button, the action of a timer, or other inputs.

=== Battery backup ===
In areas prone to power interruptions, adding battery backups to traffic controller systems can enhance the safety of motorists and pedestrians. In the past, a larger capacity of uninterruptible power supply would be required to continue the full operations of the traffic signals using incandescent lights. The cost for such a system would be prohibitive. With newer generations of traffic signals that use LED lights, which consume 85-90% less energy, it is now possible to incorporate battery backups into traffic light systems. The battery backups would be installed in the traffic controller cabinet or in their own cabinet adjacent to the controller.

The battery backups can operate the controller in emergency mode with the red light flashing or in fully functional mode. In 2004, the California Energy Commission recommended that local governments convert their traffic lights to LEDs with battery backups. This would reduce energy consumption and enhance safety at major intersections. The recommendation was for a system that provides fully functional traffic signals for two hours after the power outage. Then the signals will have flashing red lights for another two hours.

== Types of control ==
There are many types of control mechanisms for junctions controlled by traffic signals:

Type	Meaning	Conditions	Example use
Isolated pre-timed	Fixed cycle length	For temporary operation, where detection is not available	Roadworks
Coordinated pre-timed	Fixed cycle length	Where traffic is consistent	City centres, interchanges
Semi-actuated	No fixed cycle length, defaults to one movement	Traffic imbalance -	Highway operations
Fully-actuated	No fixed cycle length, detection used on all approaches, responsive to conditions	Where detection is used on all roads	Rural, high-speed locations or two arterial roads
Coordinated actuated	Fixed cycle length	Heavy traffic on arterial roads	Suburban arterial

=== Fixed time control ===
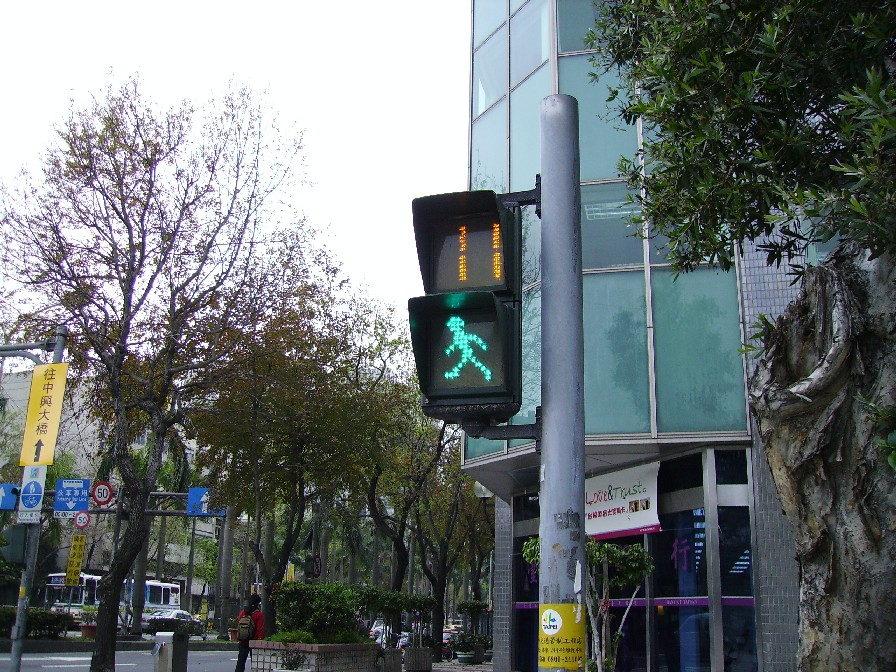
Pedestrian traffic signal in Taiwan, featuring a "Walking green man" below a countdown display where the "Red Man" once stood.

In traffic control, simple, older forms of signal controllers are known as electromechanical signal controllers. Unlike computerized signal controllers, electromechanical signal controllers are primarily composed of movable parts (cams, dials, and shafts) that control signals wired directly to them. In addition to movable parts, electrical relays are also used. In general, electromechanical signal controllers use dial timers with fixed, signalized intersection timing plans. Cycle lengths of signalized intersections are determined by small gears that are located within dial timers. Cycle gears, as they are commonly known, range from 35 seconds to 120 seconds. If a cycle gear in a dial timer fails, it can be replaced with another cycle gear that would be appropriate to use. Since a dial timer has only one signalized intersection time plan, it can control phases at a signalized intersection in only one way. Many old signalized intersections still use electromechanical signal controllers, and signals controlled by them are effective in one-way grids, where it is often possible to coordinate them with the posted speed limit. They are, however, disadvantageous when the signal timing of an intersection would benefit from being adapted to the dominant flows changing over the time of the day.

=== Coordinated control ===
Diagram demonstrating that when traffic lights are synchronised for traffic travelling in one direction (green arrows), the traffic in the other direction is not necessarily synchronised (blue arrows).

Attempts are often made to place traffic signals on a coordinated system so that drivers encounter a green wave — a progression of green lights. The distinction between coordinated signals and synchronized signals is very important. Synchronized signals change at the same time and are used only in special cases or in older systems. Coordinated (progress) systems are controlled by a master controller and are set up so that lights "cascade" (progress) in sequence, allowing platoons of vehicles to proceed through a continuous series of green lights. A graphical representation of phase state on a two-axis distance-versus-time plane clearly shows a "green band" established based on signalized intersection spacing and expected vehicle speeds. In some countries (e.g., Germany, France, and the Netherlands), this "green band" system is used to limit speeds in certain areas. Lights are timed so that motorists can drive through without stopping if their speed is below a set limit, typically 50 km/h (30 mph) in urban areas. This system is known as "grüne Welle" in German, "vague verte" in French, or "groene golf" in Dutch (English: "green wave"). Such systems were commonly used in urban areas of the United States from the 1940s, but are less common today. In the UK, Slough in Berkshire had part of the A4 experimented on with this. Many US cities set the green wave on two-way streets to operate in the more heavily traveled direction, rather than trying to move traffic in both directions. But the recent introduction of the flashing yellow arrow (see article Traffic-light signalling and operation) makes the lead-lag signal, an aid to progression, available with protected/permissive turns.

In modern coordinated signal systems, drivers can travel long distances without encountering a red light. This coordination is done easily only on one-way streets with fairly constant traffic levels. Two-way streets are often arranged to correspond with rush hours to speed up the heavier-direction traffic. However, congestion can often throw off any coordination. On the other hand, some traffic signals are coordinated to prevent drivers from encountering a long string of green lights. This practice discourages high volumes of traffic by inducing delay, yet preventing congestion, or discouraging the use of a particular road. This is often done at the request of residents in areas that have a lot of commuter "just passing through" traffic. Speed is self-regulated in coordinated signal systems; drivers traveling too fast will reach a red indication and stop, and drivers traveling too slowly will not reach the next signal in time to use the green indication. In synchronized systems, however, drivers often drive at excessive speeds to get through as many lights as possible.

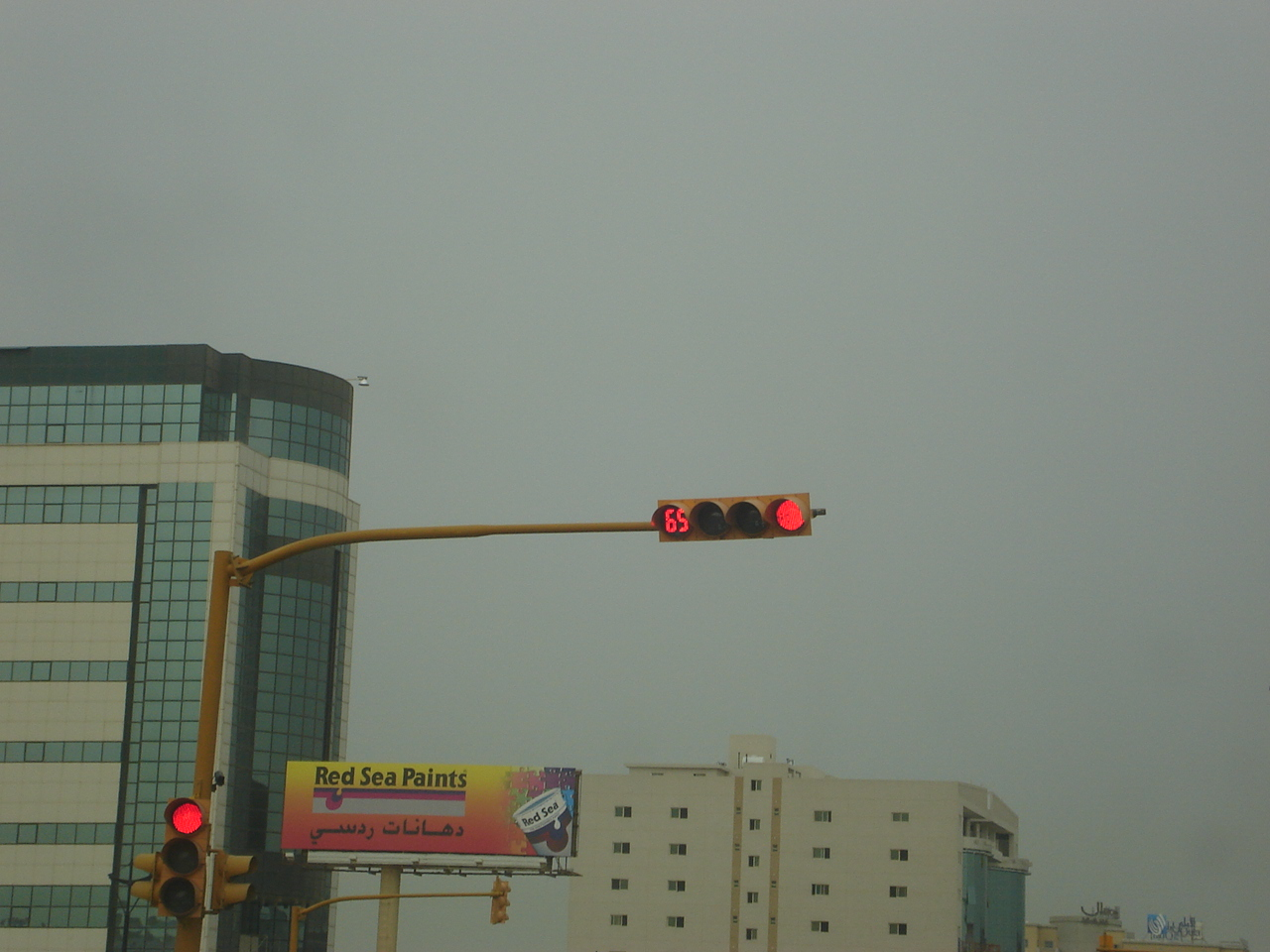
This traffic light in Khobar, Saudi Arabia is video camera-actuated (just above the vertically-aligned lenses) and also shows the seconds remaining to change to the next state (in the leftmost horizontally-aligned lens)

More recently, even more sophisticated methods have been employed. Traffic lights are sometimes centrally controlled by monitors or computers to coordinate them in real time and deal with changing traffic patterns. Video cameras, or sensors buried in the pavement can be used to monitor traffic patterns across a city. Non-coordinated sensors occasionally impede traffic by detecting a lull and turning red just as cars arrive from the previous light. The most high-end systems use dozens of sensors and cost hundreds of thousands of dollars per intersection, but can control traffic levels with great precision. This relieves the need for other measures (like new roads), which are even more expensive.

Benefits include:

- Increasing the traffic handling capacity of roads
- Reducing collisions and waiting time for both vehicles and pedestrians
- Encouraging travel within the speed limit to meet green lights
- Reducing unnecessary stopping and starting of traffic - this in turn reduces fuel consumption, air and noise pollution, and vehicle wear and tear
- Reducing travel time
- Reducing driver frustration and road rage

Examples:

- New York City: 7,660 (of a total of 12,460) signalized intersections are controlled by a central computer network and monitored by traffic management centers.
- Toronto: 83% of its signals are controlled by the Main Traffic Signal System (MTSS). 15% also use the SCOOT (Split Cycle and Offset Optimization Technique), an adaptive signal control system.
- Sydney: 3,400 traffic signals co-ordinated by the Sydney Co-ordinated Adaptive Traffic System (SCATS). Designed and developed by RTA, the system was first introduced in 1963 and progressively developed since then. By October 2010, SCATS was licensed to 33,200 intersections in 144 cities across 24 countries worldwide, including Singapore, Hong Kong, Dublin, Tehran and Minneapolis and Detroit.
- Melbourne: 3,200 traffic lights across Victoria, including regional areas such as Geelong and Ballarat, using SCATS. Some 500 intersections also have tram and bus priority.
- Adelaide: 580 sets of coordinated traffic lights throughout the metropolitan region managed by the Adelaide Coordinated Traffic Signal (ACTS) System.

=== Adaptive control ===
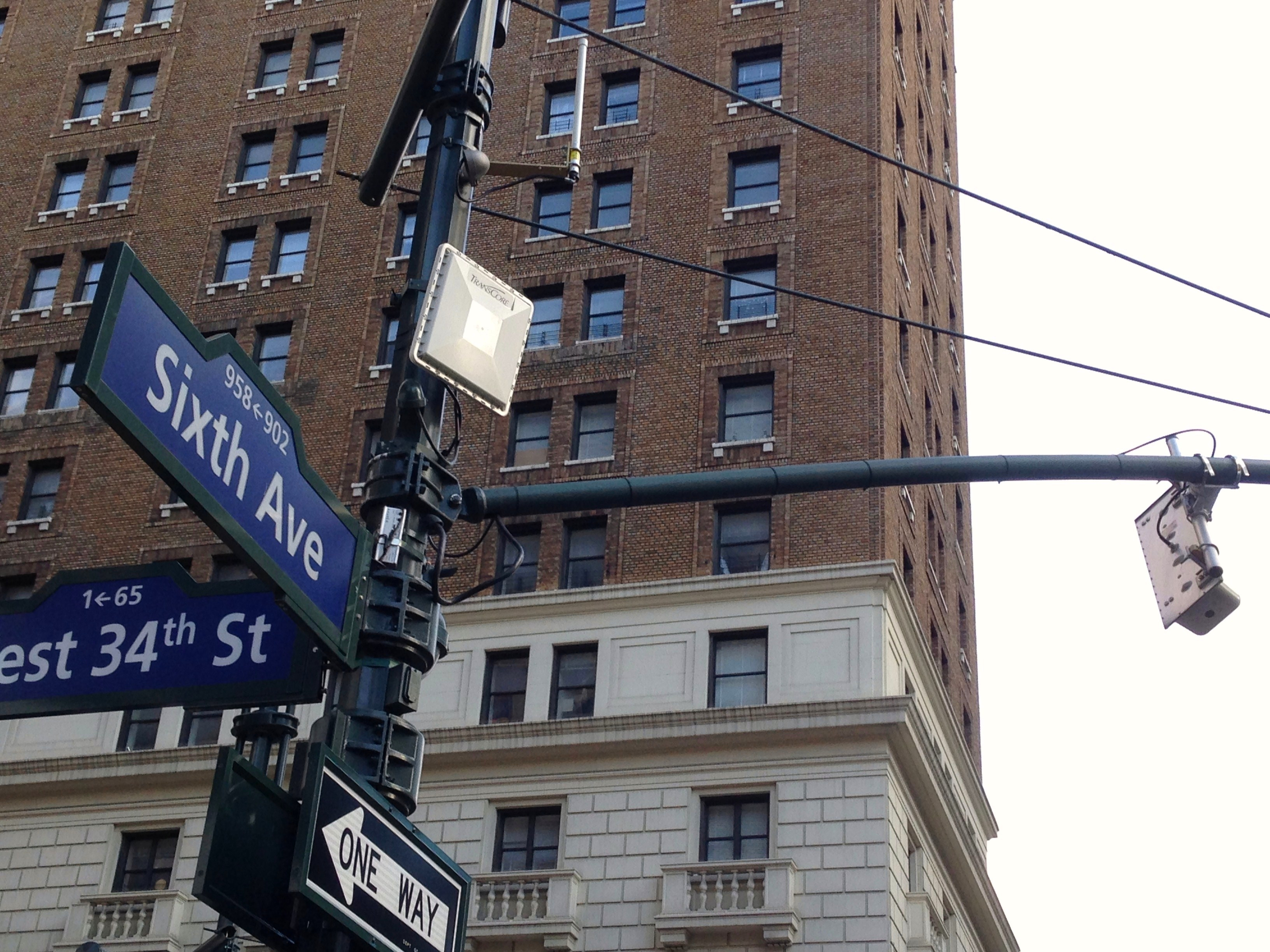
RFID E-ZPass reader attached to the pole and its antenna (right) used in traffic monitoring in New York City by using vehicle re-identification method

- Meadowlands Adaptive Signal System for Traffic Reduction (MASSTR) - New Jersey Meadowlands Commission monitors in their Lyndhurst administration building this "intelligent transportation system", the first of its kind in the state, with traffic controlled intersections and vehicle detectors in the Meadowlands. As of 2013, it is in operation and plans to cover 128 intersections by 2014. To reduce delays due to the planned two-year closure of the northbound lanes of the Pulaski Skyway that will start around March 2014, this system will synchronize traffic lights at an additional 15 intersections along US 1/9 Truck and Route 440 in Kearny Point and Jersey City.
- Midtown in Motion - New York City's adaptive traffic control system that employs multiple technologies. Cameras, microwave motion sensors, and radio-frequency identification (RFID) E-ZPass tag readers are used as inputs to monitor traffic flow. The data is transmitted via the government-dedicated broadband wireless infrastructure to the traffic management center for use in adaptive traffic control of traffic lights.
- Scalable Urban Traffic Control
- Sydney Coordinated Adaptive Traffic System

=== Other types of control ===
- Isolated control is where the timings of the junction or crossing are not linked to any other junctions or crossings.
- Failures: If power is still available, a flashing amber light is used to warn of an intersection. Methods to distinguish the main road from the secondary road (and hence the right-of-way) include yield (give way) signs, stop signs, or a flashing red light on the secondary road, as well as written signage. In some countries, including Australia, the road rules outline procedures such as giving way to the right. This system is occasionally used when a traffic signal becomes obsolete due to a lack of need.
- Part-time operation: Some traffic lights will not operate at night or when traffic is very light. Some may operate only at specific times (e.g., during the working hours of a major factory) or only during special events, such as sports or exhibitions. When not operating, the same measures used for failures are applied. The part-time operation has advantages and disadvantages.
- Railroad preemption: Traffic signals are activated to coincide with the approach of a train, often where the intersection is near a rail crossing. See also Railroad preemption
- Bus and Transport Priority: Traffic signals are activated to coincide with the arrival of a bus or tram along a busway, bus lane, or tramway. See also Bus priority
- Emergency Vehicles Some lights outside of fire or rescue stations have no green, as they may turn only amber and then red when fire trucks, ambulances, or other emergency vehicles or the like are exiting the station en route to an emergency. See also Traffic signal preemption
- Speed signs are a rarely used variant to give drivers a recommended speed to approach the next traffic light in its green phase.

== Transition ==
Transitioning from one traffic signal plan to another may cause significant disruption, such as shortened red and green intervals, leaving vehicles and pedestrians stranded, to the point that some engineers believe the transition is worse than having the wrong plan in operation. The most basic transition is to extend the main street green interval from the old traffic signal plan until the new signal plan calls for terminating the green.

== Data ==
Some jurisdictions share traffic signal timing data or traffic volume data openly, while others charge for it. Some jurisdictions do not release data at all.

In Australia, the situation differs by state. In Western Australia, the government publishes SCATS signal timing and volume data openly. In Victoria (state), the government publishes SCATS traffic volumes and 'op sheets' openly.

In 2018, Toronto was considering releasing TransSuite SPaT data on its OpenData portal so that it would be available to anyone interested. Two companies had requested access to the data to sell it to "high-end car companies".

== Design software ==
Traffic light systems are designed using software such as LINSIG, TRANSYT, CORSIM/TRANSYT-7F or VISSIM.

== Handbooks ==
In the US, there are the following handbooks:

- Seyfried, Robert K. (2013-01-01). Traffic Control Devices Handbook. Institute of Transportation Engineers. ISBN 978-1-933452-67-8.
- "Traffic Control Systems Handbook". FHWA Office of Operations. U.S. Department of Transportation Federal Highway Administration. October 2005. Archived from the original on February 1, 2009.

== See also ==
- Traffic signal phasing
- Vehicle-to-everything
- Signal_timing#Signal_Phase_and_Timing_(SPaT)
- Sydney Coordinated Adaptive Traffic System
- Split Cycle Offset Optimisation Technique (SCOOT)
