= Pulaski Skyway =

Viaduct in New Jersey, United States

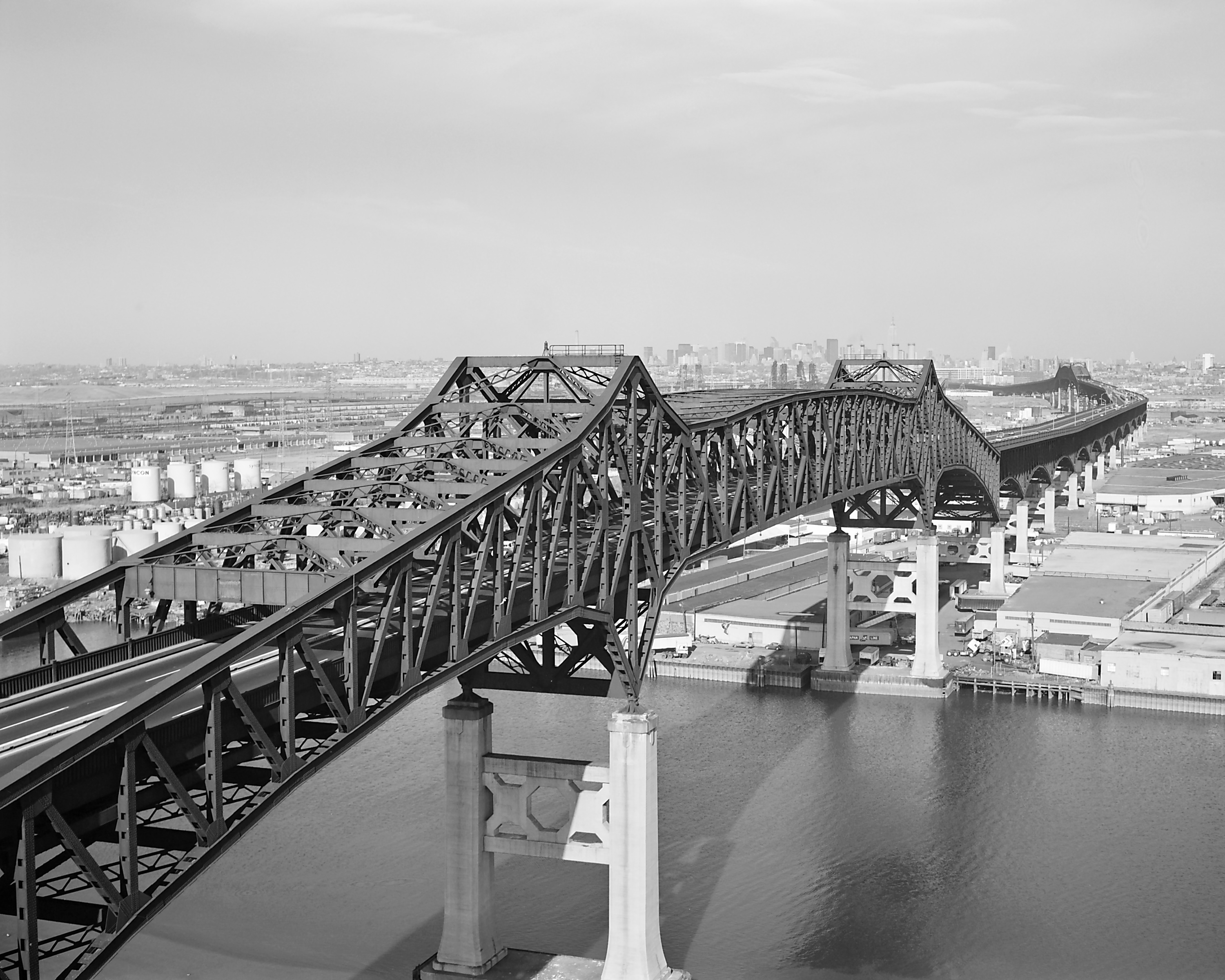
- Looking east at Passaic River crossing, with Hackensack River bridge in background
- Coordinates: 40.73583°N 74.09167°W
- Carries: US 1/9 / Route 139
- Crosses: Passaic River; Hackensack River; New Jersey Meadowlands; Kearny Point
- Locale: Jersey City, Kearny, and Newark, New Jersey, United States
- Maintained by: NJDOT
- ID number: 0901150 (Hudson County); 0704150 (Essex County)

Characteristics
- Design: Steel deck truss cantilever bridge over Meadowlands; Pratt truss for river crossings
- Total length: 3.5 mi (5.6 km) (Note: Sources vary; see Description.)
- Width: 56 ft (17 m)
- Longest span: 550 ft (168 m)
- No. of spans: 118
- Clearance above: 14 ft (4.3 m)
- Clearance below: 135 ft (41 m) (for river crossings)

History
- Opened: November 24, 1932
- Pulaski Skyway
- U.S. National Register of Historic Places
- U.S. Historic district – Contributing property
- New Jersey Register of Historic Places
- Location within Hudson County, New Jersey
- Location: US 1/9 between mileposts 51.25–54.55
- Coordinates: 40.73583°N 74.09167°W
- NRHP reference No.: 05000880
- NJRHP No.: 1526

Significant dates
- Added to NRHP: August 12, 2005
- Designated NJRHP: June 13, 2005

Location
- Interactive map of Pulaski Skyway

The Pulaski Skyway is a four-lane bridge and causeway in the northeastern part of the U.S. state of New Jersey, carrying a freeway designated U.S. Route 1/9 (US 1/9) for most of its length. The structure has a total length of around 3.5 miles (5.6 km). Its longest bridge spans 550 feet (168 m). Traveling between Newark and Jersey City, the roadway crosses the Passaic and Hackensack rivers, the Kearny Point peninsula between them, and the New Jersey Meadowlands.

Designed by Sigvald Johannesson, the General Casimir Pulaski Skyway opened in 1932 as the last part of the Route 1 Extension, one of the first freeways or "super-highways" in the United States, to provide a connection to the Holland Tunnel. One of several major projects built during the reign of Hudson County political boss Frank Hague, its construction was a source of political and labor disputes. The viaduct is listed in the state and federal registers of historic places.

Unpredictable traffic congestion and its functionally obsolete design make the Skyway one of the most unreliable roads in the United States. As of 2014, the bridges handle about 74,000 crossings per day, none of which were by trucks since they had been barred from the road in 1934. The bridges have been altered little since opening. In 2007, the New Jersey Department of Transportation (NJDOT) began a rehabilitation program, which it estimated would cost more than $1 billion and required intermittent closures. The Skyway was closed to eastbound traffic from 2014 to 2018.

== Description ==
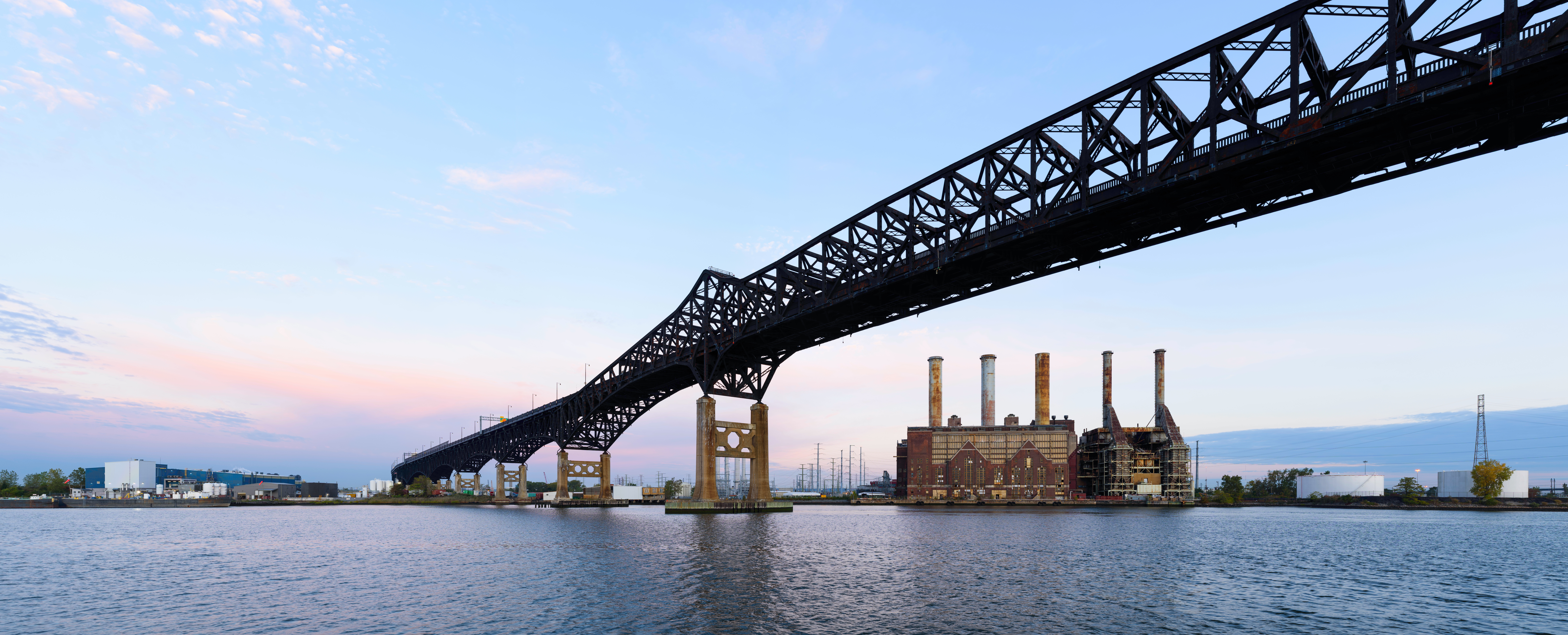
Pulaski Skyway crossing the Hackensack River

Sources differ on the length and terminal points of the skyway, which was built as part of the 13-mile (21 km) long Route 1 Extension. The National Bridge Inventory identifies the Hudson County section as 14,906 feet (4,543.5 m) long and the Essex County section as 3,592 feet (1,094.8 m). In a historic roadway and bridge study for NJDOT, it was described as 16,000 feet (4,900 m) long. NJDOT has indicated the overall length of the bridge structures to be 3.5 miles (5.6 km) and identified the Hudson County section as 14,900 feet (4,500 m) long. Other sources, along with the National Register of Historic Places, The New York Times, and The Star-Ledger, describe it as being 3.5 miles (5.6 km) long.

The four-lane skyway carries the US 1/9 concurrency for most its length, and a short section of Route 139 for the rest. While the skyway generally runs east–west between Newark and Jersey City, US 1 and US 9 are generally north–south routes. The west end of the skyway begins as US 1/9 roadway ascends and passes over Raymond Boulevard in Newark's Ironbound neighborhood. At Tonnele Circle, US 1/9 exits to grade and follows Tonnele Avenue north towards the Lincoln Tunnel and George Washington Bridge as Route 139 begins on the skyway, over the traffic circle. While the road continues to the Holland Tunnel, the skyway soon comes to its eastern end at a cut in Bergen Hill, just west of John F. Kennedy Boulevard, where Route 139 runs under the viaduct of Route 139U (the upper level). In addition to crossing the Hackensack and the Passaic, the skyway also passes over, not under, the Chaplain Washington-Harry Laderman Bridges and the New Jersey Turnpike (I-95), with which it has no interchange. Under most of the skyway in Newark is other vehicular, rail, maritime, and industrial infrastructure built on landfilled wetlands of the New Jersey Meadowlands.

Some maps, including one of Newark (1938) and one of Elizabeth (1967), labeled the US 1/9 southern approach starting north of Newark Airport as the Pulaski Skyway. An NJDOT single line diagram (2010) shows the General Pulaski Skyway starting at mile post 49.00 of U.S. 1/9, which is just north of the renamed Newark Liberty International Airport. Google Maps includes the Route 139 eastern approach.

There is limited intermediate access to the skyway: two single-lane ramps rise to the inner lanes of the elevated structure, requiring traffic to enter or exit from the left providing access at the Marion Section (southbound entrance and northbound exit only) of Jersey City and South Kearny (northbound entrance and southbound exit only).

Trucks have been prohibited for the "safety and welfare of the public" since 1934 because of the state's approval of a local ordinance that was championed by Frank Hague, mayor of Jersey City. They are detoured to use U.S. Route 1/9 Truck, along the route of the Lincoln Highway that carried traffic before the skyway's construction. Pedestrians and cyclists cannot use the road as there are no dedicated bicycle lanes or sidewalks. The speed limit on the skyway is 45 miles per hour (72 km/h), but is generally not enforceable as there is nowhere for police to pull over speeders because of the absence of shoulders.

In 2011, the Texas Transportation Institute determined that the Skyway was the sixth-most unreliable road in the United States because of the unpredictability of traffic congestion and therefore travel times.

== Design and construction ==
Except for crossings over Jersey City rail lines and the Hackensack and the Passaic, the main part of the skyway is a steel deck truss cantilever bridge, supported by concrete piers. Each of the two river crossings is a 1,250-foot (381 m) combination of a 550-foot (168 m) subdivided (K-shaped) through Pratt truss between the supports and a 350-foot (107 m) basic Pratt truss structure connecting each end to the deck truss part of the skyway. Spanning the rivers, they reach a clearance height of 135 feet (41 m). In Jersey City, three short Pratt through truss spans take the roadway over rail lines, the westernmost passing over the Port Authority Trans-Hudson (PATH) rapid transit line and the Conrail Passaic and Harsimus Line. The two easternmost Pratt through truss spans are in the vicinity of Marion Junction, one of which passes over the Marion Running Track, to the east of which the skyway is low enough to use simple vertical supports.

Design began in 1919 for the Holland Tunnel, the first fixed roadway connection between New Jersey and New York City; construction began in 1922, and the tunnel opened in late 1927. To provide for a continuous highway connection on the New Jersey side, the New Jersey Legislature passed a bill in 1922 authorizing the extension of Route 1 from its end at Elizabeth through Newark and Jersey City to the proposed tunnel. It was conceived as the nation's first "super-highway". State highway engineer Hugh L. Sloan appointed old acquaintance Fred Lavis, a consulting engineer who had worked on foreign rail lines and the Panama Canal and written four books on locating and designing rail lines, to design this Route 1 Extension. Sigvald Johannesson designed the Skyway portion.

Frank Hague, mayor of Jersey City and boss of the state's political machine, directed the state to avoid the open cuts that were already common where the railroads crossed Bergen Hill, and to include an access ramp in Kearny to spur industrial development. Construction of the highway, which was mostly raised on embankments and passed through Bergen Hill in a cut, began in mid-1925. The two major eastern and western sections in Jersey City and Newark—including the viaduct leading to the "covered roadway" (Route 139) and the embankments in eastern Newark—were opened on December 16, 1928, about a year after the tunnel opened. Traffic was still required to use the Lincoln Highway to cross the Hackensack and the Passaic on the since-replaced drawbridges that frequently stopped traffic to allow ships to pass.

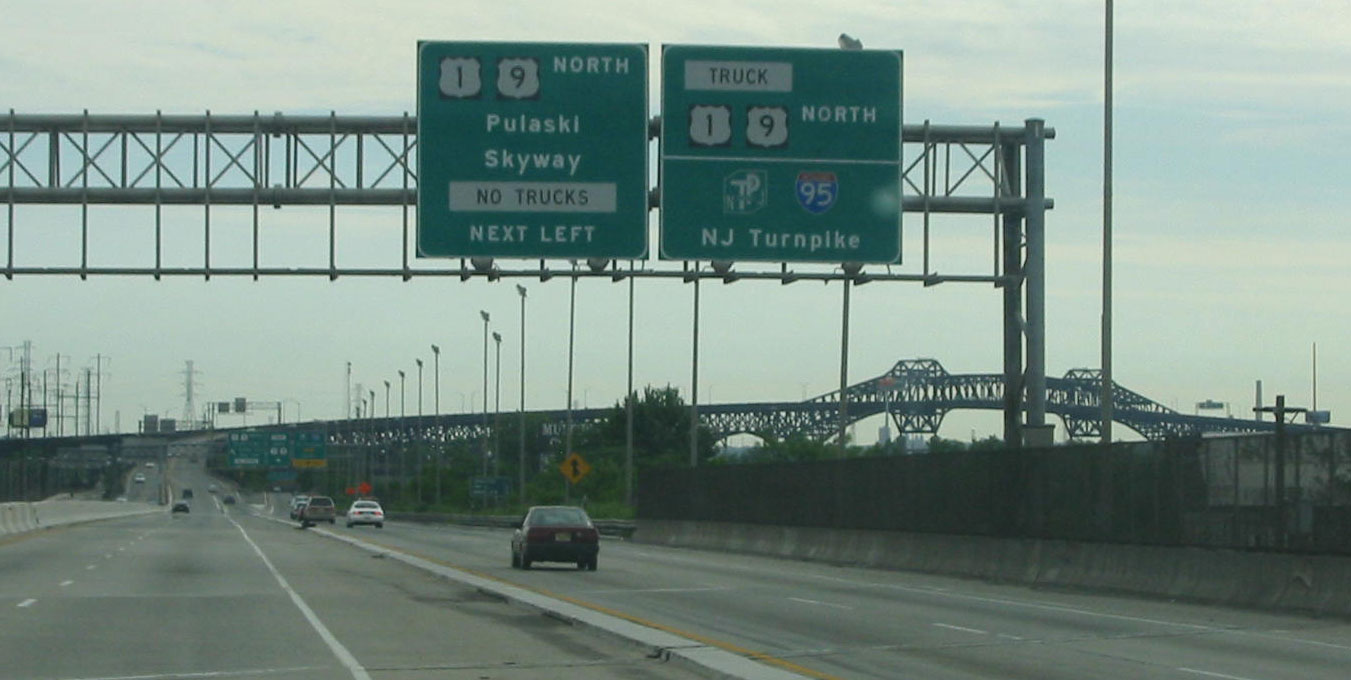
US 1/9 is elevated on embankments in eastern Newark; the skyway (background) rises higher to clear the Passaic River.

Lavis's design for the final viaduct passageway, which would be raised on concrete piers across the Meadowlands, included two vertical-lift bridges 35 feet (11 m) above the Passaic and Hackensack rivers, sufficient for the majority of ships to pass underneath. He resigned in 1928, believing his task was complete, but in January 1929 the War Department objected to the continued existence of the Lincoln Highway bridges once the skyway was complete. Since the Route 1 Extension was not intended for local traffic, and replacing the vertical-lift bridges with tunnels would have been expensive, a compromise was worked out by late 1929 to raise the river bridges to 135 feet (41 m) while allowing the Lincoln Highway drawbridges to remain in place. The concrete jacketing of the steel was removed from the plans since it would make the taller fixed bridges heavier. This resulted in more maintenance.

Four companies—the American Bridge Company, McClintic-Marshall Company, Phoenix Bridge Company, and Taylor-Fichter Steel Construction Company—were awarded contracts for the so-called "Diagonal Highway", with construction to start in April 1930. The two river bridges, McClintic-Marshall's portion, were completed first, and the $21 million road was opened at 8:00 a.m. on November 24, 1932, after an official ceremony the previous day on the Kearny ramp. Owing to the Great Depression and problems with funding, Governor A. Harry Moore directed the Highway Commission on October 25, 1932 to make a formal request to the U.S. Bureau of Public Roads to charge tolls on the Diagonal Highway. It was thought that tolls would be illegal because of the use of $600,000 of federal aid to build the road, but that it might be possible to transfer this funding to other projects. A bill was introduced into the state legislature on May 1, 1933, to add tolls to the road (then known as the "sky way"), at a rate of 10 cents for cars and 20 cents for trucks. The legal obstacle to federal aid was resolved by gaining approval to transfer the funds.

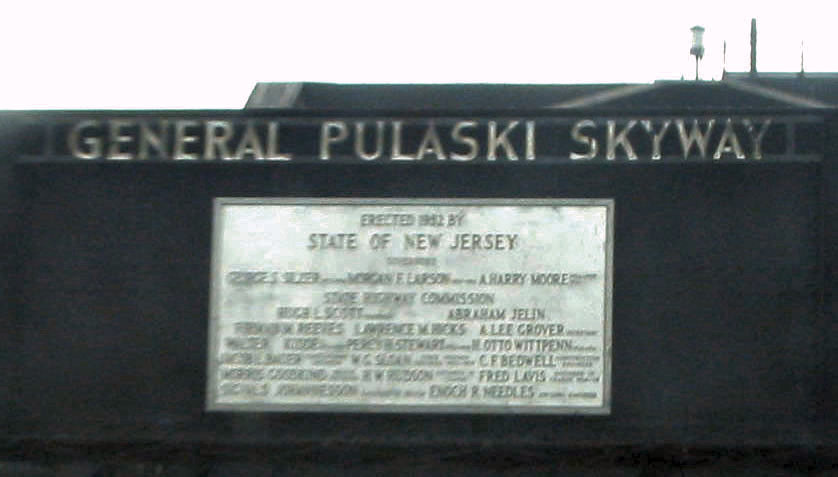
A plaque with dedication details

During planning and construction, and for about half a year after opening, the road had no official name and was known as the Diagonal Highway, Newark–Jersey City Viaduct, or High-Level Viaduct. On May 3, 1933, the New Jersey Legislature passed a bill sponsored by Assemblyman Eugene W. Hejke of Jersey City naming the road the General Casimir Pulaski Memorial Skyway after Casimir Pulaski, the Polish military leader who helped train and lead Continental Army troops in the American Revolutionary War. An official ceremony was held on October 11, 1933, including the unveiling of signs with an abbreviated designation, Gen. Pulaski Skyway.

Surveys taken during 1932 and 1933 proved that the skyway saved time on the new and old routes. Not only was the distance shortened by one-half mile (0.80 km), but it took at least six minutes less to travel the new route during regular traffic. Trucks gained even more time, saving anywhere from five to eleven minutes. During times of previous traffic congestion on weekends on the old route, the viaduct saved around 25 minutes or more from the elimination of traffic congestion. In addition, the new route did not have the much longer delays and traffic back-ups that were caused whenever the bridges on the old highway were opened. It was found that the skyway also diverted a good deal of traffic from other routes.

== Labor issues ==
Pulaski Skyway construction ended up causing a dispute between Mayor of Jersey City Frank Hague, who ran a statewide political machine, and Theodore M. Brandle, a "labor czar" allied with Hague. Brandle and Hague had become friends through Hague's efforts to get approval of unions. Brandle helped organize Branleygran Company, a construction bond underwriter, which Hague channeled construction projects towards. During the mid-1920s redevelopment of Journal Square, Brandle's Labor National Bank, founded in June 1926, acquired a new 15-story headquarters, the Labor Bank Building. Essentially Brandle controlled any construction projects in northern New Jersey, and any strikes he might call would be backed by Hague's police.

The relationship between Hague and Brandle started to go bad in late 1931, during construction of Jersey City Medical Center, an important project to Hague. Leo Brennan, a contractor approved by Hague without consulting Brandle, who was building a backup power station for the hospital, refused to work with Brandle's card-file system, by which he kept track of union members and blacklisted those whom he disliked. The annoyed Brandle called a strike, but Brennan's workers refused; the police shut down the site after a brawl, but Brennan got court approval to continue. To placate Brandle, who threatened a strike that would stop all construction work on the center, Hague paid off Brennan and hired another contractor that Brandle had approved.

For the construction of the Pulaski Skyway, which began in April 1930, Hague chose four members of the National Erectors' Association, an organization of "open shop" (non-union) steel contractors. Performance bonds were paid in cash, bypassing Branleygran, and the companies hired Foster's Industrial and Detective Bureau to guard the site against Brandle's threat to "unionize this job or else". Brandle organized picket lines of loyal union men, and the two sides frequently fought in the streets or in the work area. Brandle's sole victory was a five-day stoppage in July 1931 by 165 non-union workers, who were interested in higher pay and afraid of the ongoing fights, but decided against joining the union. During the La Follette Civil Liberties Committee hearings, it was discovered that, in order to save about $50,000 in salary, the American Bridge Company, one of the four contractors, spent almost $300,000 on keeping its "open shop".

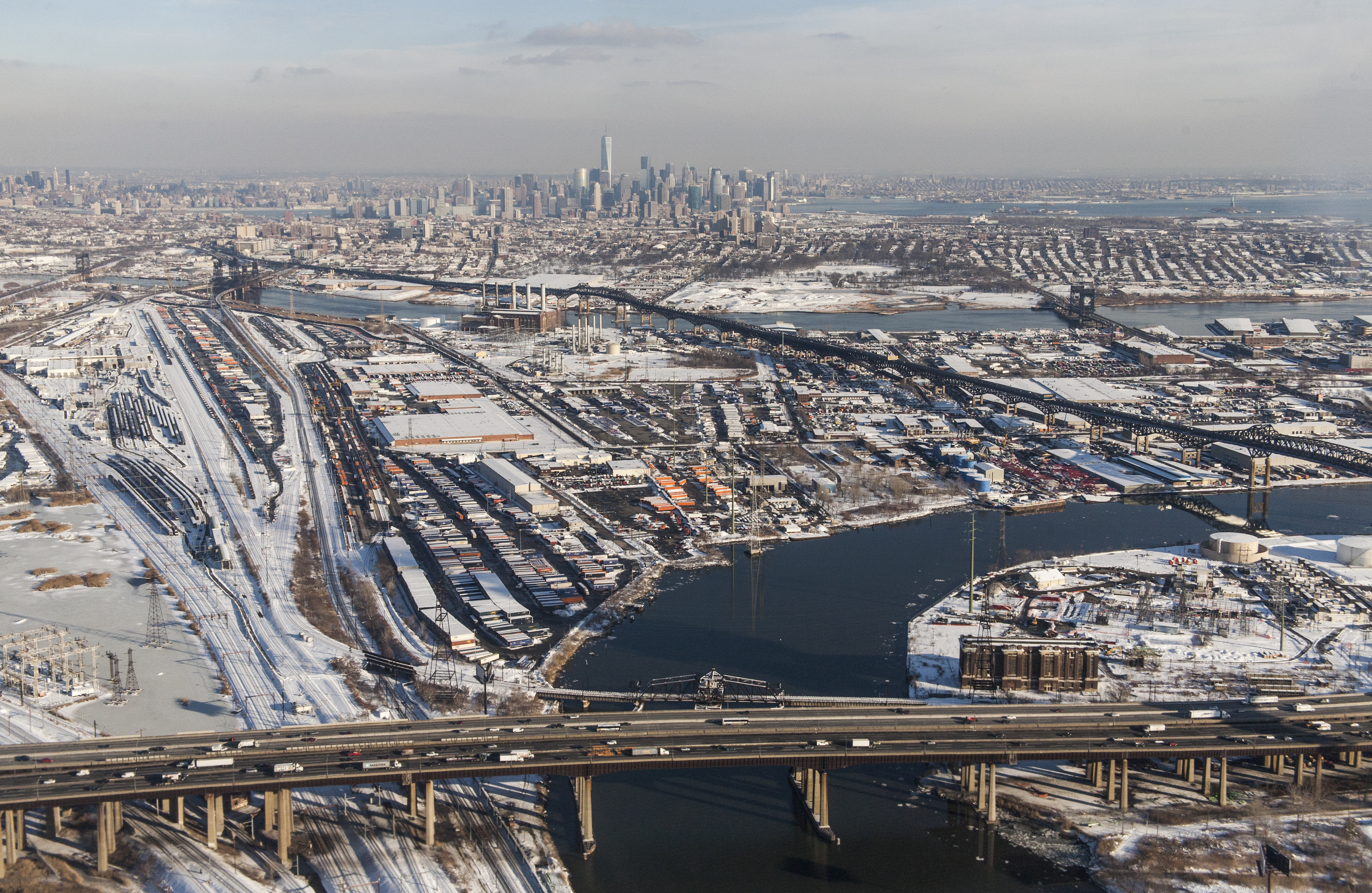
Looking east with almost the entire skyway in the background from the Passaic River to its terminus in Jersey City; New Jersey Turnpike in the foreground

The first casualty of the labor battle was a picketer, shot and temporarily paralyzed by a perimeter guard on November 14, 1931, for throwing stones at workers. Several months later, on February 27, 1932, a car carrying six workers to the construction site was surrounded by union men, who began to beat them with iron bars. One of the workers, William T. Harrison, was dead by the next morning; Hague broke all ties with Brandle and ordered the police to "wage relentless war against the Brandle gang-rioters". In April 1932, 21 ironworkers were indicted as suspects in the Harrison murder. The trial was held on December 6, 1932, two weeks after the completion of the skyway. Every defendant was found not guilty, since county prosecutor John Drewen was unable to place any of them at the scene of the crime, and witnesses and defendants testified that they had been forced under torture or the threat of prosecution to sign affidavits and confessions. In addition to William T. Harrison's death, 14 lives were claimed by work-related accidents during construction.

Hague refused to allow Brandle and the unions to win, and began to force unions to foreclose through his control of the courts. On the public side, Hague attacked the "labor racketeers" with words, and the local newspapers gladly went along. In 1937 and 1938, Hague turned Jersey City into a police state to fight the Congress of Industrial Organizations (CIO), which was trying to inform workers of their rights under the 1935 National Labor Relations Act. Socialist Norman Thomas was prevented from speaking in Jersey City and Newark by Hague and his friends. This and other similar cases turned the national spotlight on Hague, and he was attacked by the New Yorker and Life in early 1938. Finally, in 1947, Governor Alfred E. Driscoll cut off Hague's judicial power, and the mayor retired.

== Truck and other safety issues ==
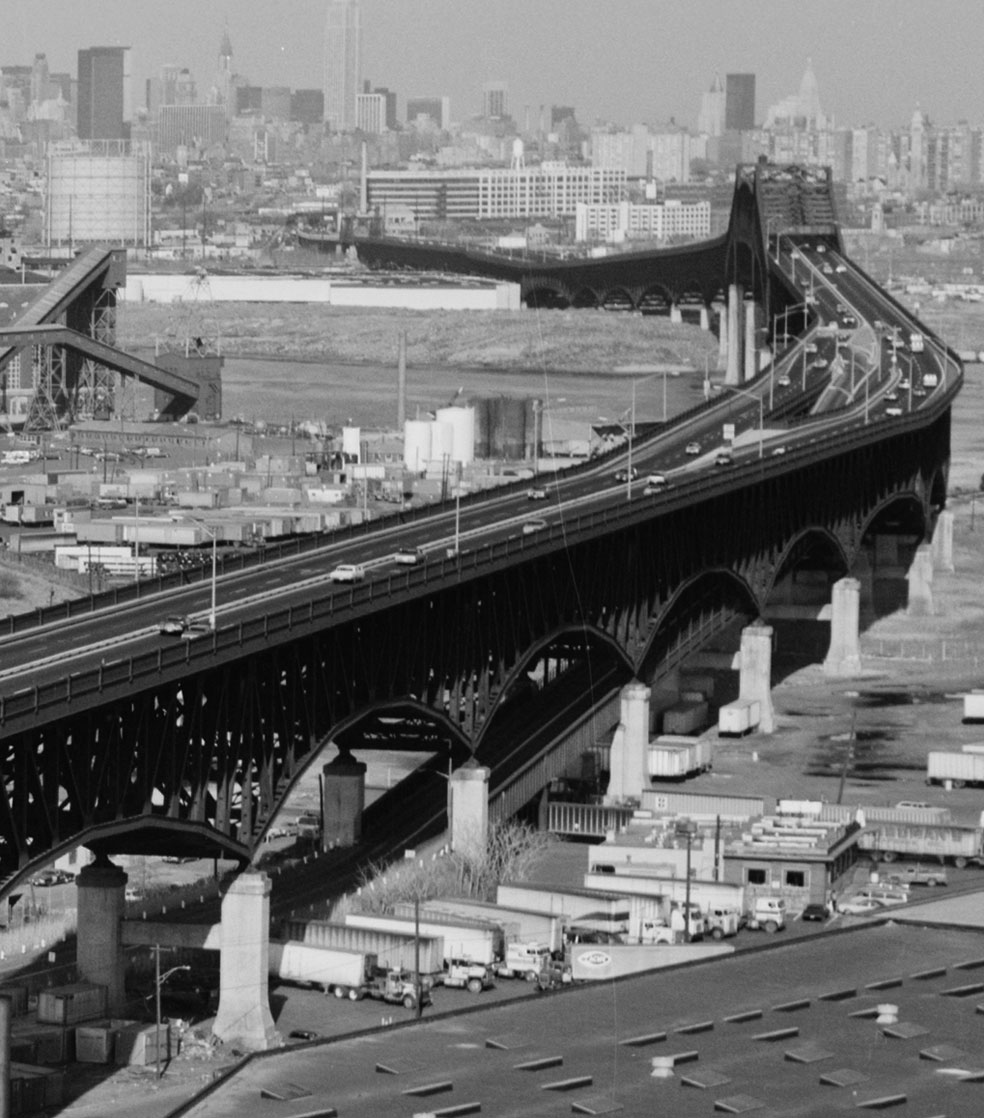
Looking east at the South Kearny ramp. Built to promote industrial development, its steep incline was too dangerous for trucks. (1978 photo from Historic American Engineering Record Survey, NJ-34)

The slippery concrete surfacing, steep left-side ramps, center breakdown lane, and wide-open alignment built for high speeds all contributed to a high number of crashes. Jersey City Mayor Frank Hague passed an ordinance in November 1933 banning trucks from its section of the skyway, which effectively banned them from the whole road. Enforcement began on January 15, 1934, when Jersey City police began arresting truck drivers using the skyway. The New Jersey State Highway Commission approved the ban on January 23.

As a result of controversy caused by the ban, 300,000 ballots were distributed on February 6 to motorists on the skyway, asking whether trucks should be banned. Mayor Hague promised to go with the majority, which agreed with the ban. The matter was also taken to court, with one of the convicted truck drivers arguing that the ban was an unreasonable restraint of interstate commerce, and that since the federal government contributed money towards the road, Jersey City lacked the power to ban trucks. On August 14, Justice Thomas W. Trenchard of the New Jersey Supreme Court upheld the ban, stating that "the court is not at liberty to substitute its judgment for that of the municipality's as to the best and most feasible manner of curing traffic evils and traffic congestion where such regulation bears a direct relationship to public safety and is reasonable and not arbitrary." The Tonnele Circle Viaduct, a new offramp allowing westbound trucks from the Holland Tunnel to bypass Tonnele Circle to southbound US 1/9 Truck, which now also leads to Interstate 280 (I-280), opened on September 14, 1938. The Newark Bay Extension of the New Jersey Turnpike (I-78) opened in September 1956, allowing trucks to bypass the old surface road, US 1/9 Truck.

On May 21, 1952, large numbers of trucks were spotted by Jersey City police entering the city on the skyway. Upon pulling over the drivers, they were told that the exit in Newark for the truck route was closed for construction. A call to Newark police confirmed the situation. Hudson County police refused to force trucks to exit before Jersey City, since there was no state law banning trucks from the skyway. Jersey City Police Chief James McNamara gave in, and trucks were temporarily allowed to use the skyway, though only in one direction.

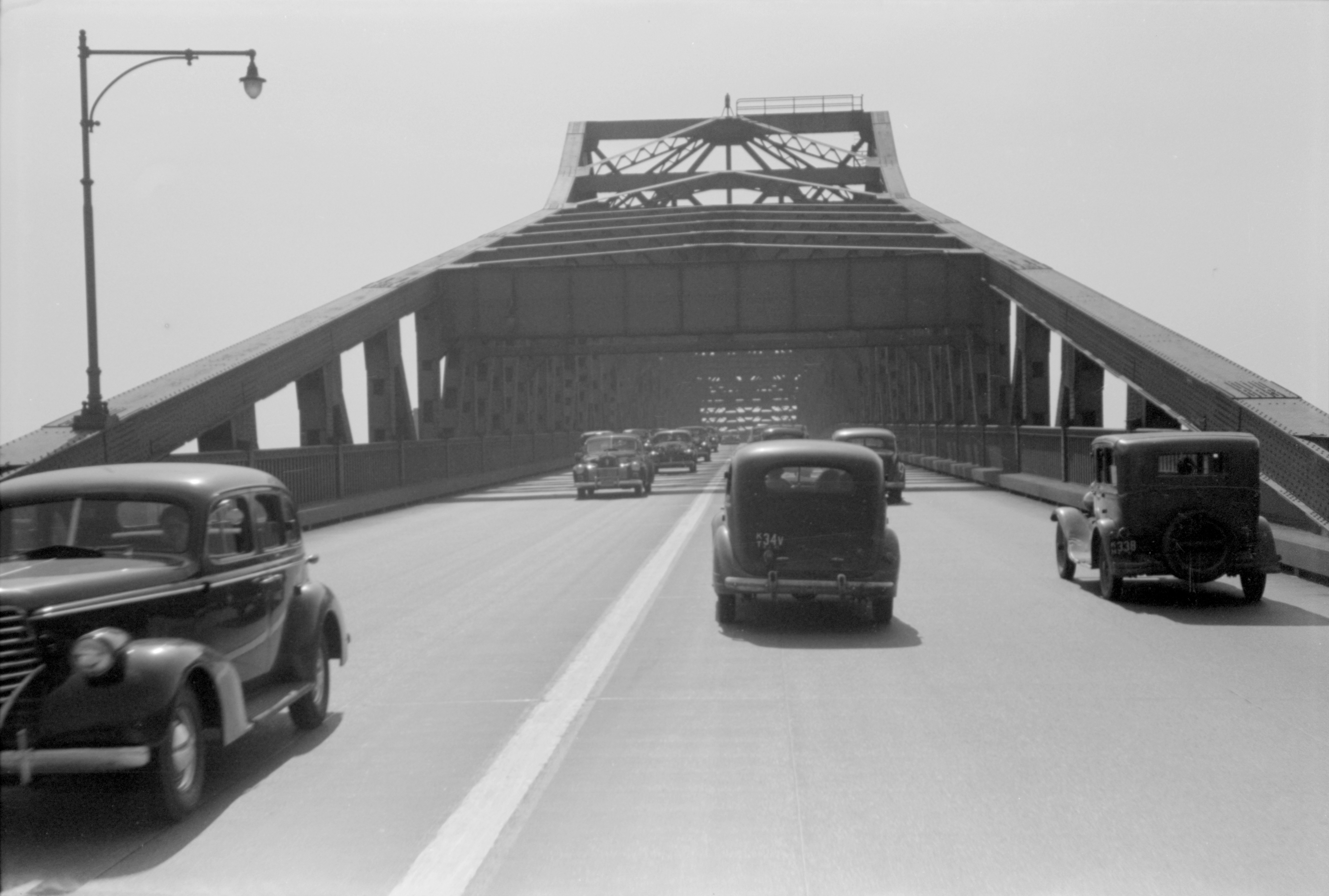
1941 photo, before the median barrier was installed

When the skyway first opened, it carried five lanes; the center one was intended as a breakdown lane, but was used as a "suicide lane" for passing slower traffic. By the 1950s, the skyway was seeing over 400 crashes per year; an aluminum median barrier was added in mid-1956, in addition to a new pavement coating designed to make the road less slippery.

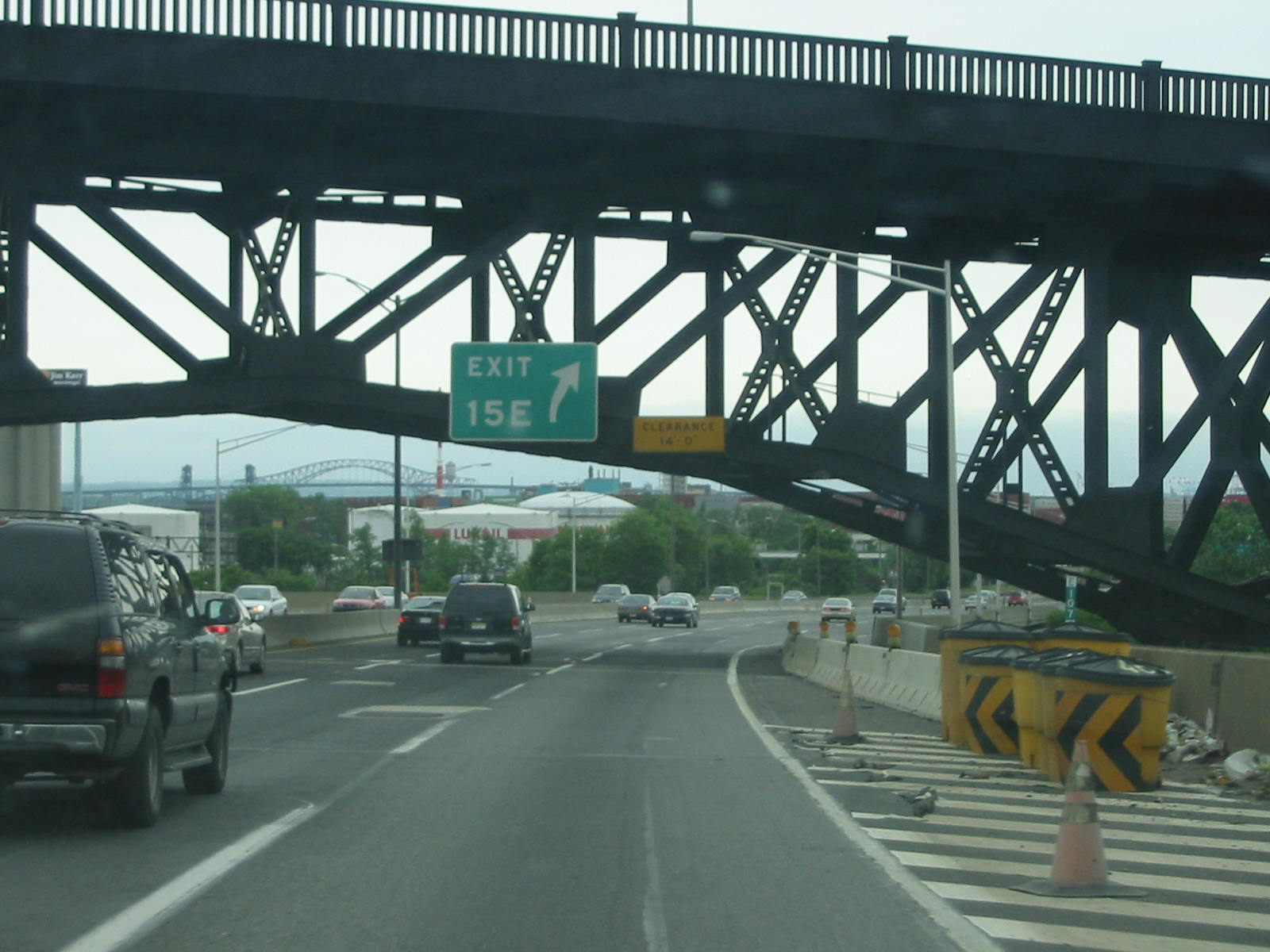
The New Jersey Turnpike, as seen in 2004 before it was lowered as part of a seismic retrofit and widening project, passes under the skyway.

The skyway was a constraint in the building of the New Jersey Turnpike in 1951. The turnpike had to be built low enough to provide enough clearance underneath the skyway, but high enough to then provide sufficient clearance over the nearby Passaic River. Turnpike engineers could have built over the skyway (at a much higher cost) or under the skyway's trusses; the latter option was chosen. As part of a 2005 seismic retrofit project, the New Jersey Turnpike Authority lowered the Passaic River Viaduct Bridge on its easterly alignment to increase vertical clearance and allow for full-width shoulders underneath the Pulaski Skyway. Engineers replaced the bearings and lowered the turnpike bridge by four feet (1.2 m), without shutting it to traffic.

== Rehabilitation ==
By the 2000s, the Pulaski Skyway was considered functionally obsolete since its design did not meet highway bridge standards. In 2007, it was rated structurally deficient. The 2007 collapse of the I-35W Mississippi River bridge in Minneapolis raised concerns about the stability of the skyway, which was one of eight New Jersey bridges with similar design features. Within days of the collapse, NJDOT announced that it would start a previously planned one-year, $10-million project to make critical repairs. The work was the first phase of a planned 10-year, $200-million interim renovation project, and marked the skyway's first significant repairs since 1984.

After work began, it was determined that the repairs needed were more extensive, costly, and time-consuming than expected, and NJDOT estimated that rehabilitation could cost more than $1.2 billion. In 2009, NJDOT estimated that it would take a decade before the state could afford to rehabilitate or replace the structure. In a controversial move in 2011, Governor Chris Christie directed the Port Authority of New York and New Jersey (PANYNJ) to divert money originally earmarked for the Access to the Region's Core rail project to highway projects. The agency agreed to pay $1.8 billion to partially fund efforts to rehabilitate the skyway and Route 139, replace Wittpenn Bridge, and extend US 1/9 Truck, all part of the larger distribution network in the Port of New York and New Jersey.

In January 2013, NJDOT announced that work on the $335 million projects for repaving and restoration of the roadway would begin at the end of 2013 by the state owned China Construction America Company. To facilitate the work, the eastbound lanes (northbound US 1/9) would close for two years after the Super Bowl XLVIII in February 2014 at the nearby Meadowlands Sports Complex. The proposal was opposed by local politicians, who contended that it did not satisfactorily address the effect on local traffic and called for more thorough investigation into alternatives. The closure date was postponed by NJDOT to more completely work out comprehensive traffic and travel options.

The roadway remained open through the use of alternate lane closures during the work until April 12, 2014, affecting the 74,000 daily crossings. The rehabilitation project, with an estimated cost of $1.2–1.5 billion, is being done in phases and spread out over ten contracts, the first of which began in 2012, and the last, for final painting of the steel structure, planned for completion in 2020. The improvements are expected to extend the life of the bridge until at least 2095.

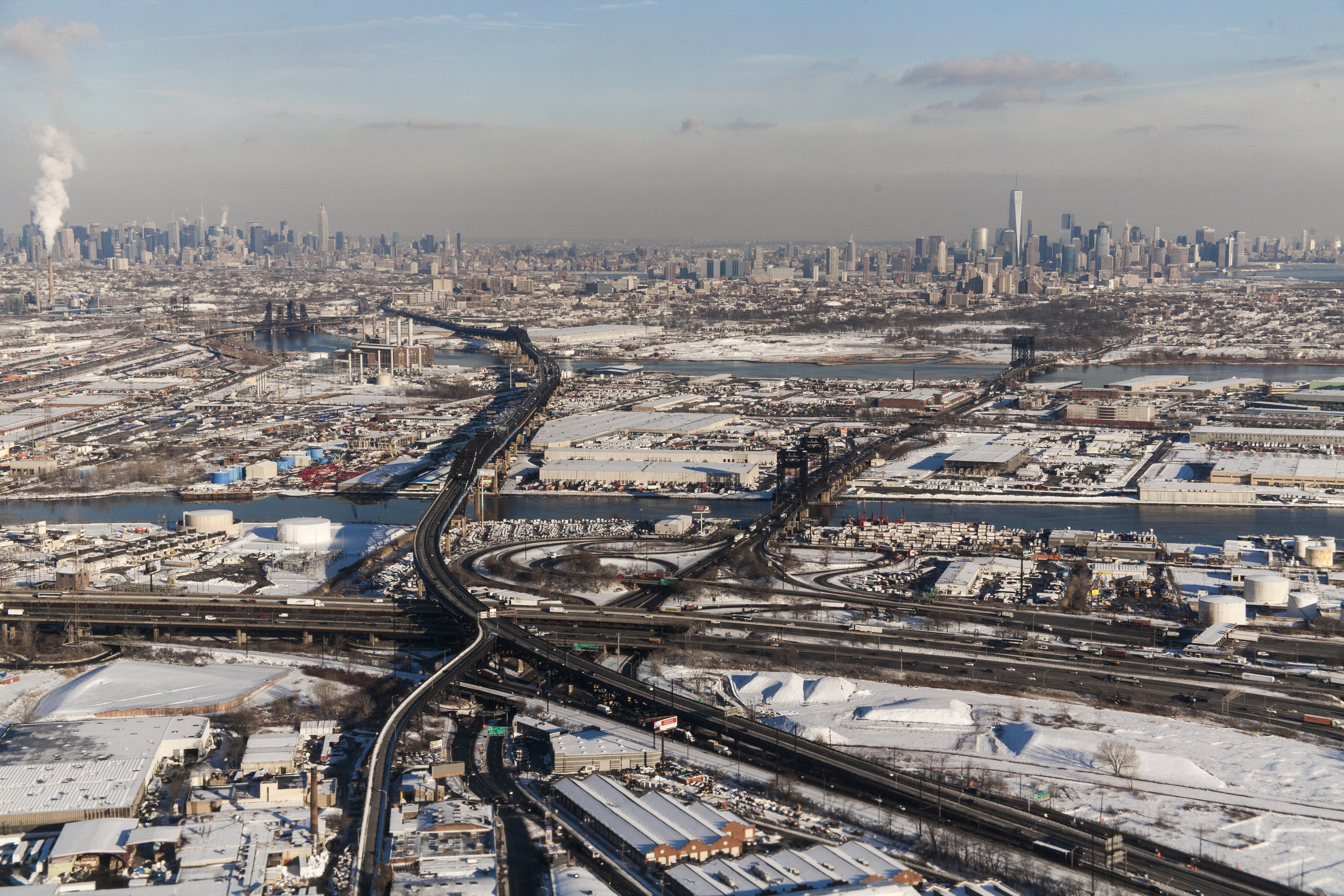
The Pulaski Skyway (left), looking east, and the Lincoln Highway (US 1/9 Truck) cross the Passaic and Hackensack rivers. The New Jersey Turnpike is visible in the foreground.

The skyway was closed for eastbound (northbound US 1/9) traffic on April 12, 2014, for two years in order to replace the entire bridge deck. The midway access ramps in South Kearny and Jersey City were closed to regular traffic, but would be available to emergency responders. In April 2015, NJDOT said that unforeseen additional repairs would be made, extending the scheduled April 2016 completion date to sometime later that year and adding $14 million in costs. In March 2018, after several construction delays, it was announced that the Pulaski Skyway was set to be reopened to all traffic that spring. The skyway reopened to all traffic on June 30, 2018, two days earlier than NJDOT had originally announced. Auxiliary projects, such as rehabilitation of ramps onto the skyway and reconstruction of Route 139, are expected to continue at least through 2026. As of 2024, construction on 6 out of 13 contracts had been completed, with 3 more under construction and 4 in the preparatory phase. As of 2025, all but two of the projects were planned to be finished by 2030.

=== Travel alternatives ===
NJDOT worked with New Jersey Transit (NJT) to bolster public transportation, encouraged car and van pooling, worked with local community officials, employers, truckers, local port employees, and the public to alleviate problems and address flexible working hours, and publicized alternate transportation options through television, radio, social media, news media, and its skyway website.

To ease congestion, the Turnpike Authority converted a shoulder of the Newark Bay-Hudson County Extension of the New Jersey Turnpike to a traveling lane. Temporary lane control lights on six miles (9.7 km) of the extension would indicate that extra lane is open during peak hours, at which time the speed limit would be reduced. This set-up would be able to handle 1,900 vehicles an hour in addition to the slightly more than 4,000 vehicles per hour on the existing lanes during peak periods. To reduce delays, variable message signs would provide motorists with daily traffic alerts and an adaptive traffic signal system would be installed and monitored by the Meadowlands Commission to synchronize traffic lights at 15 intersections along US 1/9 Truck and Route 440 in Kearny Point and Jersey City. They are part of a larger "intelligent transportation system", the Meadowlands Adaptive Signal System, a network of traffic-controlled intersections with vehicle detectors in the Meadowlands. In anticipation of traffic overflow onto local Jersey City streets, off-duty police officers would be hired to direct traffic heading to the Holland Tunnel during rush hours.

To promote public transportation, NJT and PATH offered more frequent peak hour train services to Newark, Hoboken and Jersey City on the Hudson Waterfront, and Manhattan. NJT added a new bus route for peak hour service between Watchung and Newark Penn Station, along the US 22 corridor, and their bus schedules accommodated additional passengers on existing routes.

=== Funding controversy ===
On June 12, 2014, the PANYNJ acknowledged that the Securities and Exchange Commission, New York County District Attorney, and United States Attorney for the District of New Jersey were investigating its diversion of $1.8 billion to fund the Pulaski Skyway and other New Jersey roadway rehabilitation projects. These inquiries were related to how this funding, which was made at the urging of the Christie administration, was potentially misrepresented in documents related to bond sales. State laws require the PANYNJ to spend money only related to its own facilities, unless it gets approval from lawmakers in New Jersey and New York. The PANYNJ documents state that the Pulaski Skyway was designated as also providing access to the Lincoln Tunnel, even though it is miles from the tunnel and does not connect to it directly. In December 2014, United Airlines filed a complaint with the Federal Aviation Administration that claims that since 2004 the PANYNJ has diverted more than $2 billion from the metro area airports to non-airport uses and that in 2014 alone it spent $181 million to repair the Pulaski Skyway and $60 million on the Wittpenn Bridge, NJDOT-owned and -operated structures.

== In popular culture ==
The Skyway has been featured in various popular culture media. In the 1938 radio drama The War of the Worlds, one of the Martian machines straddles the Skyway; the scene was later replicated in the 2005 film adaptation. It was featured in the films Hair (1979) and Shadow of a Doubt (1943), and in the opening credits of the 1999–2007 television drama The Sopranos. Rock band Clutch included the track "Pulaski Skyway" on its 2005 album Robot Hive/Exodus. The Skyway is the subject of The Last Three Miles: Politics, Murder, and the Construction of America's First Superhighway, a 2007 history book by Steven Hart. The 2008 video game Grand Theft Auto IV, partially set in a fictional recreation of New Jersey, features an elevated highway through its industrial area that was based off the Skyway.

== See also ==
- List of bridges documented by the Historic American Engineering Record in New Jersey
- List of bridges, tunnels, and cuts in Hudson County, New Jersey
- List of crossings of the Hackensack River
- List of crossings of the Lower Passaic River
