= TRANSYT-7F =

- Developer(s): McTrans Center, University of Florida
- Stable release: TRANSYT-7F 11.3 (2010)
- Operating system: Microsoft Windows
- Website: http://mctrans.ce.ufl.edu/featured/TRANSYT-7F/

TRANSYT-7F is a traffic simulation and signal timing optimization program. The primary application of TRANSYT-7F is signal timing design and optimization. TRANSYT-7F features genetic algorithm optimization of cycle length, phasing sequence, splits, and offsets. TRANSYT-7F combines a detailed optimization process (including genetic algorithm, multi-period, and direct CORSIM optimization) with a detailed macroscopic simulation model (including platoon dispersion, queue spillback, and actuated control simulation).

== History ==
TRANSYT-7F is an acronym for TRAffic Network StudY Tool, version 7F. The original TRANSYT model was developed by the Transport Research Laboratory in the United Kingdom. TRANSYT, version 7 was "Americanized" for the Federal Highway Administration (FHWA); thus the "7F." The TRANSYT-7F program and the original TRANSYT-7F manual were developed for the Federal Highway Administration (FHWA) under the National Signal Timing Optimization Project (NSTOP) by the University of Florida Transportation Research Center (TRC). TRANSYT-7F continues to undergo further development, and is currently maintained by the University of Florida's McTrans Center.

== Capabilities ==
- Simulation of existing conditions and future conditions
- Multi-period optimization, hill-climb optimization
- Lane-by-lane analysis, actuated control analysis
- Direct CORSIM optimization, CORSIM post-processing
- One-touch CORSIM animation, one-touch HCS analysis
- Optimization based on a wide variety of objective functions
- Explicit simulation of platoon dispersion, queue spillback, and queue spillover
- Flexibility in accepting U.S. customary units or metric units, right-hand drive or left-hand drive
- Genetic algorithm optimization of cycle length, phasing sequence, splits, and offsets

== Literature ==
Hale, D.K. and K.G. Courage, "Prediction of Traffic-Actuated Phase Times on Arterial Streets", Transportation Research Record 1811, pp. 84–91, 2002.
Showers, R.H., "Development of a Moment-Based Platooning Index," University of Florida Transportation Research Center, 1993.
Chen, P.J., "Hand-Held Microcomputer Applications in Data Collection for Measuring Platoon Dispersion Based on Cyclic Flow Profiles," Masters Report, University of Florida Transportation Research Center, Spring, 1993.
Penic, M.A. and J. Upchurch, "TRANSYT-7F: Enhancement for Fuel Consumption, Pollution Emissions, and User Costs," Transportation Research Record 1360, 1992.
Hadi, M.A. and C.E. Wallace, "A Progression-Based Optimization Model for TRANSYT-7F," Transportation Research Record 1360, Washington, DC, 1992.
Wallace, C.E., K.G. Courage and E.C.P. Chang, Methodology for Optimizing Signal Timing—the M|O|S|T Reference Manual, Volume 1 of a series prepared for FHWA by COURAGE AND WALLACE, Gainesville, FL, December 1991.
Hadi, M.A., "Improved Strategies for Traffic Responsive Control in Arterial Signal Systems," Ph.D. Dissertation, University of Florida, 1990.
Register, R.P., "A Comparison of PASSER III and TRANSYT-7F Diamond Intersection Signal Timing," Masters Report, University of Florida, 1989.
Akçelik, R., "Opposed Turns at Signalized Intersections: The Australian Method," ITE Journal, Vol. 59, No. 6, pp. 21–27, June 1989.
Skabardonis, A., "Progression Through a Series of Actuated Controllers," prepared for FHWA, DHS, Inc., October 1988.
Skabardonis, A. and A. Weinstein, "TRANSYT-7FC, TRANSYT Model for Actuated Signals," Institute for Transportation Studies, University of California, Berkeley, CA, April 1988.
Skabardonis, A., "Signal Timing Optimization in Networks with Actuated Controllers," paper presented on the 66th Annual Meeting of the Transportation Research Board, Washington, D.C., January 1987.
Cohen, S.L. and C.C. Liu, "The Bandwidth-Constrained TRANSYT Signal-Optimization Program," Transportation Research Record 1057, 1986.
Wallace, C.E. and F. White, "Development of Algorithms for Permitted Traffic Movements in TRANSYT- 7F," prepared for Federal Highway Administration, University of Florida Transportation Research Center, 1986.
Nemeth, Z.A. and J.R. Mekemson, "Guidelines for Left-Turn Treatment at Signal Controlled Intersections," Ohio State University, 1984.
Luk, J.Y.K. and R.W. Stewart. A Comparison Study of Three Urban Network Models. Saturn, TRANSYT-7F, and NETSIM. Australian Transport Research Forum Papers. 1984. pp. 51–66.
Dudek, G.R., L.R. Goode., and M.R. Poole. TRANSYT-7F and NETSIM -Comparison of Estimated and Simulated Performance Data. Institute of Transportation Engineers. ITE Journal, Vol. 53, No.8. 1983. pp. 32–34.
Machemehl, R.B. and A.M. Mechler, "Procedural Guide for Left-Turn Analysis," Center for Transportation Research, Report No. CTR 3-18-80-258-3F, University of Texas at Austin, 1983.
Wallace, C.E. and K.G. Courage, "Arterial Progression-a New Design Approach," Transportation Research Record 881, 1982.
Wallace, C.E., K.G. Courage and D.P. Reaves, "National Signal Timing Optimization Project-Final Evaluation Report," prepared for the Federal Highway Administration by the University of Florida Transportation Research Center, 1981.
Tarnoff, P.J. and P.S. Parsonson, "Selecting Traffic Signal Control at Individual Intersections, Volume 1," National Cooperative Highway Research Program Report 233, June 1981.
Akçelik, R., "Traffic Signals: Capacity and Timing Analysis," Australian Road Research Board (ARRB) Research Report 123, Victoria, Australia, 1981.
Akçelik, R., "Time Dependent Expressions for Delay, Stop Rate and Queue Length at Traffic Signals," Australian Road Research Internal Report, ARRB Ltd., Vermont South, Victoria, 1980.
Lorick, H.C., C.E. Wallace and R.E. Jarnagin, "Analysis of Fuel Consumption and Platoon Dispersion Models," University of Florida Transportation Research Center, Report No. UF-TRC-U32-TR-02, 1980.
Wallace, C.E., "Development of a Forward Link Opportunities Model for Optimization of Traffic Signal Progression on Arterial Highways," Ph.D. Dissertation, University of Florida, 1979.
Michalopoulos, P.G., J. O'Conner and S.M. Nova, "Estimation of Left-Turn Saturation Flows," Transportation Research Record 667, 1978.
Fambro, D.B., C.J. Messer and D.A. Andersen, "Estimation of Unprotected Left-Turn Capacity at Signalized Intersections," Transportation Research Record 644, 1977.
Robertson, D.I., "TRANSYT: A Traffic Network Study Tool," Road Research Laboratory Report, LR 253, Crowthorne, 1969.
Robertson, D.I., "TRANSYT: Traffic Network Study Tool," Fourth International Symposium on the Theory of Traffic Flow, Karlsruhe, Germany, 1968.
Hillier, J.A. and R. Rothery, "The Synchronization of Traffic Signals for Minimum Delay," Transportation Science, 1967.
Webster, F.V., "Traffic Signal Settings," Road Research Technical Report No. 39, London, United Kingdom, 1958.

== See also ==
- Traffic flow
- Synchro
- PTV Vistro
