= Sigvald Johannesson =

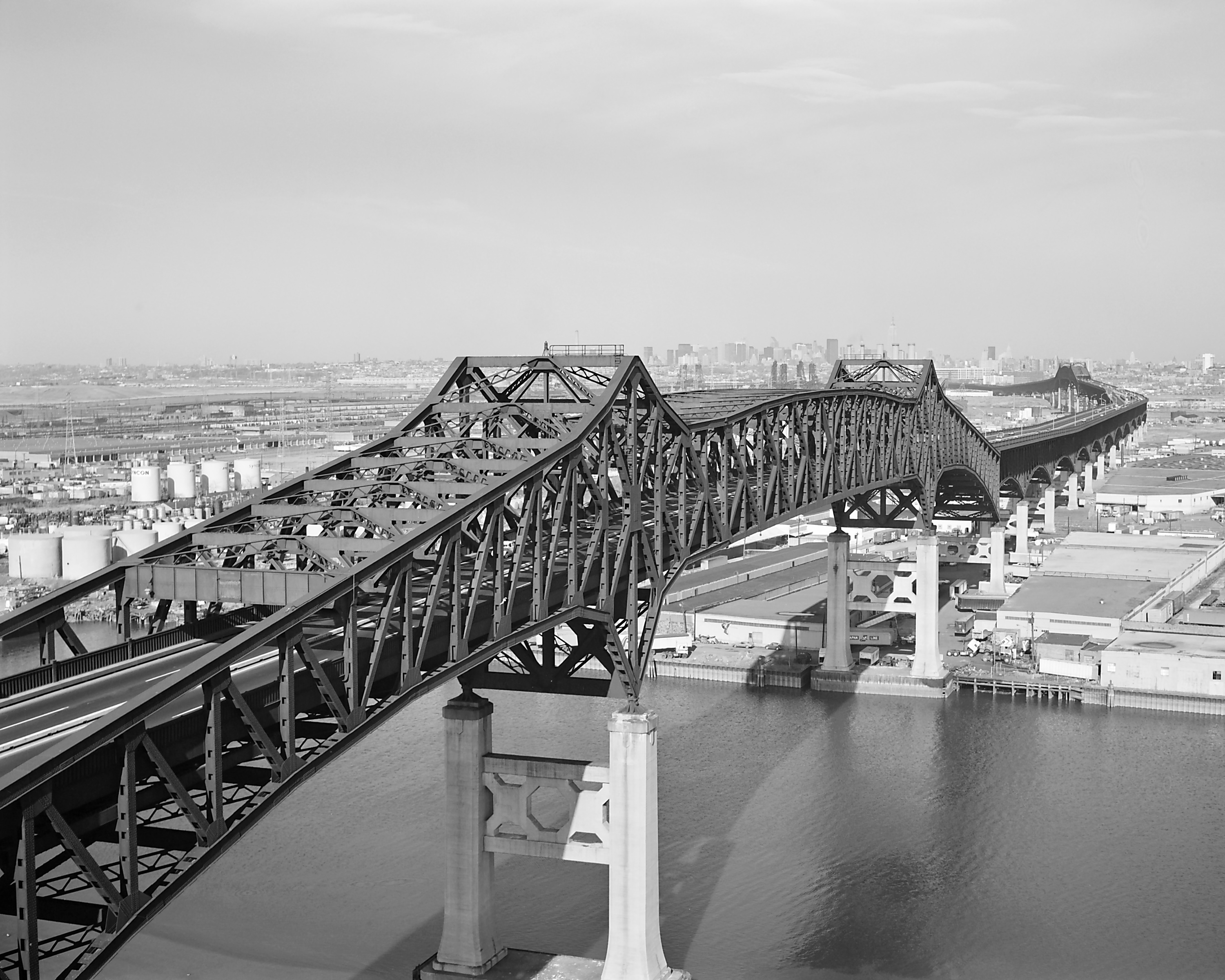
The Pulaski Skyway crosses the Passaic River and the Hackensack River

Sigvald Johannesson (1877–1953) was a civil engineer best known for his design of the Pulaski Skyway.

Johannesson was a graduate of the University of Copenhagen who later worked on the London Underground. He emigrated to the United States and worked on the North River Tunnels and the Hudson and Manhattan Railroad tunnels under the Hudson River. He joined the New Jersey Highway Department (now the New Jersey Department of Transportation) during the early development of the Skyway project and is considered to be responsible for its ultimate design. Johannesson worked the agency until his retirement in 1948 as head of the Division of Planning and Economics. In 1931, he published a seminal work entitled Highway Economics. He died in 1953.
