= LinSig =

- LinSig 3 under Windows 10 for a crossroads junction. The network layout and signal stage sequence are visible.
- Developer: JCT Consultancy
- Stable release: 3.2 / May 2012
- Operating system: Windows
- Type: Traffic Software
- License: Software license agreement
- Website: http://www.jctconsultancy.co.uk

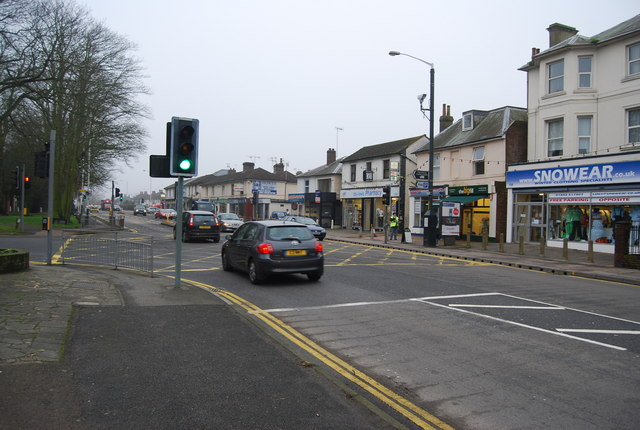
A typical signalised junction with vehicle and pedestrian signals in the UK.

LinSig is software by JCT Consultancy which allows traffic engineers to model traffic signals and their effect on traffic capacities and queuing. As well as modelling the effects of traffic signals LinSig also optimises signal timings to reduce delay or increase capacity at a junction or group of interlinked junctions.

== History ==
LinSig was developed in the UK by Brian Simmonite in the 1980s who went on to set up JCT Consultancy. The software has been updated a number of times during its life.

=== MS-DOS ===
LinSig was first written in the mid-1980s as an MS-DOS-based tool for analysing and optimising single traffic signal junctions. The use of the software spread mainly by word of mouth within the traffic signals profession becoming widely used by signal engineers. The LinSig traffic modelling was based on standard 'Y' value hand calculations which were widely used at the time for manually calculating traffic signal capacities and delays. This allowed the results of the software to be easily checked against existing manual calculations.

=== LinSig for Windows Version 1 (March 2000) ===
LinSig for Windows Version 1 retained the same modelling capabilities as the earlier MS-DOS versions but provided a Windows interface. This version also introduced graphical diagrams into the software showing information such as the junction's lane layout and the phasing and staging arrangements.

=== LinSig Version 2 (April 2006) ===
LinSig Version 2 was the first version of LinSig to allow the modelling of more than one junction. A new network traffic model was introduced which allows the coordination of closely spaced traffic signal junctions to be modelled.

=== LinSig Version 3 (June 2009) ===
LinSig 3 changed from a link-based model to a lane-based model. It also allowed the user to model larger networks and provides new network modelling tools such as delay-based traffic assignment and entropy-based trip matrix estimation. Using this software it is possible to model signalised roundabouts.

== Modelling basis ==
LinSig uses a development of the Cyclic Flow Profile traffic model which has been used extensively in the UK for many years. The Cyclic Flow Profile Model simulates the interaction between closely space junctions allowing coordinated signal timings to be modelled.

=== Typical Input data ===
LinSig input data includes observed traffic flows, traffic signal controller phases and stages, time between green signals, saturation flows and lane lengths.

=== Pedestrian Modelling ===
Pedestrian delays at signal junctions can be modelled for individual or linked crossings.

== Signal optimisation ==
LinSig optimises signal timings either to maximise traffic capacity or minimise delay at a junction.

== Network modelling ==
LinSig can model and optimise networks of several junctions as well as individual junctions. It is designed to model small groups of junctions in detail rather than larger networks covering entire towns.

=== Delay Based Assignment ===
LinSig uses a traditional user equilibrium assignment to assign traffic to routes through the network based on delays calculated by the network model.

=== Matrix Estimation ===
LinSig provides a matrix estimation facility to generate a network wide trip matrix from junction turning counts. This uses a combination of traditional entropy-based estimation methods together with customisations targeted at estimating matrices in smaller networks.

== Alternative solutions ==
The main competitor within the UK marketplace is TRANSYT.

== See also ==
- Traffic light control and coordination
