= Split Cycle Offset Optimisation Technique =

Split Cycle Offset Optimisation Technique (SCOOT) is a real-time adaptive traffic control system for the coordination and control of traffic signals across an urban road network. Originally developed by the Transport Research Laboratory for the Department of Transport in 1979, research and development of SCOOT has continued to present day. SCOOT is used extensively throughout the United Kingdom as well as in other countries.

SCOOT automatically adjusts the traffic signal timings to adapt to current traffic conditions, using flow data from traffic sensors. Sensor data is usually derived from inductive loops in the carriageway but other forms of detection are increasingly being used.

Adjacent signal controlled junctions and pedestrian/cycle crossings are collected together into groups called "regions". SCOOT then calculates the most appropriate signal timings for the region. SCOOT changes the stage lengths or the splits to ensure that the delays are balanced as much as possible, changes the cycle time to ensure that delays are minimised and finally changes the offset between the signal installations to ensure that the timings are co-ordinated as well as possible.

SCOOT has been demonstrated to yield improvements in traffic performance of the order of 15% compared to fixed timing systems.

In early 2021, TRL released SCOOT 7, having updated the algorithm to work with future mobility needs.

== Replacement with FUSION ==
Transport for London has developed FUSION in partnership with Yunex Traffic technology to replace the SCOOT system. TfL aims to have FUSION technology at 500 locations by the end of 2025/26 and a complete deployment to 4350 sites by the end of 2030/31.

== See also ==
- Traffic light control and coordination
- Sydney Coordinated Adaptive Traffic System
