= Adaptive traffic control =

Traffic management strategy

Adaptive traffic control system (ATCS) is a traffic management strategy in which traffic signal timing changes, or adapts, based on actual traffic demand. This is accomplished using an adaptive traffic control system consisting of both hardware and software.

== Every Day Counts initiative ==
The U.S. Federal Highway Administration, through its Every Day Counts initiative, is working to accelerate the adoption of adaptive signal control technologies in the U.S. Its website states, "Real-time management of traffic systems is proven to work, yet these systems have been deployed on less than 1 percent of existing traffic signals. FHWA is now working to bring these technologies to the rest of the country."

== Examples ==
InSync adaptive traffic control system is a real-time adaptive traffic control system that enables traffic signals to immediately adapt to traffic demand.

MASSTR (Meadowlands Adaptive Signal System for Traffic Reduction) located in the Meadowlands Region of northern New Jersey will incorporate over 128 signals when complete. As of June 2013, over 50 of the signals were operational. The project built by the New Jersey Meadowlands Commission (NJMC) is a network self-adaptive signals utilizing the Sydney Coordinated Adaptive Traffic System (SCATS). MASSTR was awarded a $10 million TIGER2 grant from the Federal Highway Administration.

MOVA (Microprocessor-Optimised Vehicle Actuation) uses inductive loops in the carriageway to detect traffic on each approach to an isolated junction, and vary the signal timings as required.

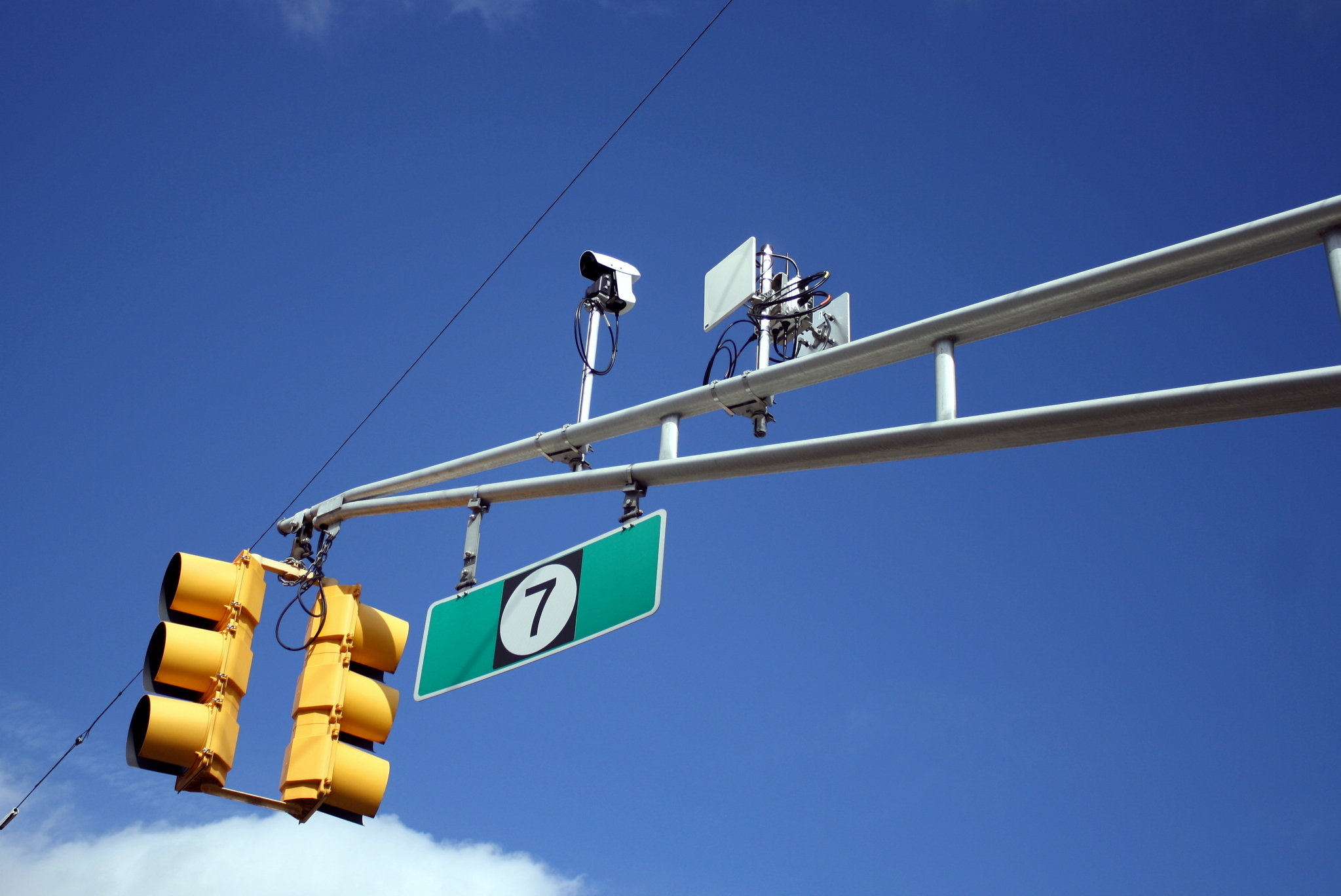
MASSTR detection camera and radio on a traffic signal mast arm

== Comparisons ==
In 2010, a comparison study across United States cities found InSync had the highest operation benefits in all categories by "a significant margin", compared to Sydney Coordinated Adaptive Traffic System and ACS-Lite. InSync reduced delays, travel times and the number of stops significantly more than the other systems.

== See also ==
- SURTRAC adaptive traffic control system
- SCOOT
- Sydney Coordinated Adaptive Traffic System
- Adaptive Traffic control system using AI - Pushpak.ai
