= Scalable Urban Traffic Control =

Scalable Urban Traffic Control (SURTRAC) is an adaptive traffic control system developed by researchers at the Robotics Institute, Carnegie Mellon University. SURTRAC dynamically optimizes the control of traffic signals to improve traffic flow for both urban grids and corridors; optimization goals include less waiting, reduced traffic congestion, shorter trips, and less pollution. The core control engine combines schedule-driven intersection control with decentralized coordination mechanisms. Since June 2012, a pilot implementation of the SURTRAC system has been deployed on nine intersections in the East Liberty neighborhood of Pittsburgh, Pennsylvania. SURTRAC reduced travel times by more than 25% on average, and wait times were reduced by an average of 40%. A second phase of the pilot program for the Bakery Square district has been running since October 2013. In 2015, Rapid Flow Technologies was formed to commercialize the SURTRAC technology. The lead inventor of this technology, Dr. Xiao-Feng Xie, states that he has no association with and does not provide technical support for this company.

== Design ==
The SURTRAC system design has three characteristics. First, decision-making in SURTRAC proceeds in a decentralized manner. The decentralized control of individual intersections enables greater responsiveness to local real-time traffic conditions. Decentralization facilitates scalability by allowing the incremental addition of controlled intersections over time with little change to the existing adaptive network. It also reduces the possibility of a centralized computational bottleneck and avoids a single point of failure in the system.

A second characteristic of the SURTRAC design is an emphasis on real-time responsiveness to changing traffic conditions. SURTRAC adopts the real-time perspective of prior model-based intersection control methods which attempt to compute intersection control plans that optimize actual traffic inflows. By reformulating the optimization problem as a single machine scheduling problem, the core optimization algorithm termed a schedule-driven intersection control algorithm, is able to compute optimized intersection control plans over an extended horizon on a second-by-second basis.

A third characteristic of the SURTRAC design is to manage urban (grid-like) road networks, where multiple competing dominant flows shift dynamically through the day, and where specific dominant flows cannot be predetermined (as in arterial or major crossroad applications). Urban networks also often have closely spaced intersections requiring tight coordination of the intersection controllers. The combination of competing for dominant flows and densely spaced intersections presents a challenge for all adaptive traffic control systems. SURTRAC determines dominant flows dynamically by continually communicating projected outflows to downstream neighbors. This information gives each intersection controller a more informed basis for locally balancing competing inflows while simultaneously promoting the establishment of larger "green corridors" when traffic flow circumstances warrant.

== Criticism ==
The SURTRAC system employs closed-circuit television (CCTV) cameras to monitor traffic conditions. This use of CCTV networks in public spaces has sparked debate, with some critics arguing that such surveillance can contribute to an erosion of privacy and potentially facilitate more authoritarian forms of governance by reducing the anonymity of individuals in public areas. Moreover, CCTV footage can be processed with technologies like automatic number plate recognition software, enabling the tracking of vehicles based on their license plates. Facial recognition software can also analyze these images to identify individuals by their facial features. However, it is noted that the resolution of the cameras utilized in the SURTRAC system is reportedly not high enough to enable the detection of license plates or the recognition of individual faces.

There has also been discussion regarding the overall efficacy and impact of traffic optimization systems. Critics have suggested that the benefits of such systems have not been conclusively proven through scientific study. Additionally, concerns have been raised that these systems might inherently favor motorized traffic, potentially leading to disadvantages for pedestrians, bicyclists, and public transit users, and could inadvertently encourage increased use of automobiles.

== See also ==
- Traffic optimization
- Adaptive traffic control
- Smart traffic signals
- Traffic light control and coordination
- Intelligent transportation system
- Transportation demand management
- Automated planning and scheduling

== Other adaptive traffic control systems ==
- Sydney Coordinated Adaptive Traffic System
