= Traffic signal phasing =

Sequencing method for traffic signal phases

In the field of traffic engineering, traffic signal phasing refers to sequencing methods at an intersection such that all movements and users are accommodated in a safe and efficient manner. Traffic signals facilitate serving of one or more movements at the same time.

== Design considerations ==
During the initial phasing design process, a signal phase plan is selected before other aspects of signal timing can be determined analytically. After this starting point is established, further fine-tuning is often required to address all the complexities.

=== Left turns ===
Left turn treatment, or right turn treatment for left-hand traffic countries, is a critical aspect when deciding an appropriate phase plan. A left turn may be:

- Permitted left turns, where a vehicle makes the left turn after selecting an appropriate gap in the moving opposing flow;
- Protected left turns, where a left-turning vehicle is "protected" from opposing traffic flow, which is stopped by the traffic signal;
- Compound left turns, where the signal provides permitted left turns for a portion of the cycle and protected left turns for another portion.

There are five different phasing options for left turn movements:

- Permitted left-turn phase
- Protected left-turn phase
- Protected-permitted left-turn phase
- Split phase, where one approach direction gets assigned all right-of-way movements, before the opposing approach receives the same assignment
- Prohibited left-turn phase, implemented with a "no left turn" sign at intersections

Selecting a left turn phasing is subject to the consideration of the following factors: Turning and opposing through volumes, number of opposing through lanes, speed of opposing traffic, sight distance, and accident history.

=== Right turns ===
Right turns, or left turns for left-hand traffic countries, are commonly handled through a permitted basis, mostly via shared lanes. However, protected right-turn phases are used when pedestrian volumes are so high that right turns on green are significantly blocked.

=== Pedestrians ===
A phase diagram with a pedestrian exclusive phase as its third phase, when only pedestrians are allowed to cross.

Concurrent phasing where pedestrians and vehicles cross the same street together.

Pedestrians are normally assigned to two types of signal phasing:

- Exclusive phasing, where a portion of the cycle is reserved for pedestrians' crossing in any direction while all vehicle movements are halted.
- Concurrent phasing, where pedestrians cross streets at the same time as their parallel vehicular counterparts

An option to blend the concurrent phasing and exclusive phasing is a leading pedestrian interval (LPI), where pedestrians receive their walk signal at least 3 seconds prior to their parallel vehicular movements are allowed to proceed. LPI offers better operational characteristic than exclusive phasing and help pedestrians become more visible to vehicle operators.

Intersections with high pedestrian traffic cause drivers having difficulties finding acceptable gaps to make permissive left or right turns. To avoid conflicts, such intersections shall terminate the pedestrian phase prior to the phase with permissive turns for vehicular traffic.

== Diagrams ==
Animation demonstrating a "lead-lag left turn" phase plan for the major street. Top right: phase diagram Bottom right: ring diagram showing 2 rings

Signal phase plans are presented and illustrated using phase diagrams (or “stage diagrams” in UK) and ring (Note: In the United States, traffic phases are organized by grouping them in continuous loops called "rings", which highlight conflicting or sequential phases. The similar concept in Australia is termed a "signal group", defined as a set of lanterns "sharing the same color sequence within each phase and for each phase sequence.") diagrams. In both diagrams, allowed movements are shown in solid arrows (protected movements) and dashed arrows (permitted movements). If a turning movement is made through a shared lane with through movement, the arrows are shown as connected. Pedestrian movements may also be shown on the diagrams, generally depicted as doted lines with double arrowhead, which indicates the bi-directionality of crosswalks.

Phase diagrams show all movements in a given phase using a single block. Ring diagrams indicate which movement is controlled by which ring, a structure on traffic signals that controls one set of signal faces. Ring diagrams are more informative when overlapping phase sequences are used. A barrier may be added in the ring diagram to separate the crossing or conflicting traffic flow, which produces a ring barrier diagram.

== Common phase plans ==
=== Basic two-phase plan ===
A basic two-phase phase plan

A basic two-phase sequence is the most common phase plan in use. In this phase sequence, each street receives one signal phase, and all turns are handled on a permitted basis. The streets may contain exclusive turning lanes but are not required to be configured so. Such phase is selected when left turn traffic does not impose unsafe or unreasonable delays.

=== Exclusive left-turn phase ===
A phase plan with an exclusive left-turn phase

Including an exclusive left-turn phase in the phase plan means that opposing left-turn movements are simultaneously assigned an exclusive protected turn phase while all through movements are stopped. This phase may be inserted either before or after the through and/or right phase of the subject approach, with before being the most common arrangement. When fully protected phasing cannot accommodate left turn demand without resulting in an undesirably long cycle length, the phase plan may be modified to include a compounded left turn by adding a permitted left turn movement to the through phase.

=== Leading and lagging left turn phases ===
A phase plan with lead-lag left turn phase sequence

A leading left turn is a protected left turn used prior to the opposing traffic receiving the signal to proceed. A lagging green is a protected left turn served after the opposing traffic is stopped. A lead-lag green phase sequence is when a leading protected left turn is followed by an overlapping through green for the subject street, which is then followed by a lagging left turn. During the overlapping through green phase, a permitted green may also be issued, creating a compound phase. Lead-lag left turn phase allows traffic engineers to assign different left turn phase durations to a pair of opposing left turns, a potential source of inefficiency for exclusive left-turn phases.

At intersections where protected and permitted left turn phases are used, leading left turn is the most common phase. According to traffic departments in Arizona, there's no difference in safety performance between leading and lagging left turns. A study from 2003 concludes that lagging left turns give better results for coordinated traffic signals.
