= CORSIM =

Traffic simulation software package

- Developer(s): McTrans Center, University of Florida
- Stable release: TSIS-CORSIM 6.3
- Operating system: Windows XP, Windows 7 and Windows 10
- Website: https://mctrans.ce.ufl.edu/tsis-corsim/

TSIS-CORSIM is a microscopic traffic simulation software package for signal systems, highway systems, freeway systems, or combined signal, highway and freeway systems. CORSIM (CORridor SIMulation) consists of an integrated set of two microscopic simulation models that represent the entire traffic environment. NETSIM represents traffic on urban streets. FRESIM represents traffic on highways and freeways. Microscopic simulation models the movements of individual vehicles, which include the influences of geometric conditions, control conditions, and driver behavior. TSIS (Traffic Software Integrated System) is an integrated development environment that enables users to conduct traffic operations analysis. Built using a component architecture, TSIS allows the user to customize the set of included tools, define and manage traffic analysis projects, define traffic networks and create inputs for traffic simulation analysis, execute traffic simulation models, and interpret the results of those models.

== History ==
NETSIM was originally developed under the name “Urban Traffic Control System” (UTCS-I) in the early 1970s. This program evolved under the direction of the Federal Highway Administration (FHWA) and was later renamed NETSIM (abbreviated for NETwork SIMulation). FRESIM (abbreviated for FREeway SIMulation) is an enhanced and reprogrammed version of its predecessor, the INTRAS (INtegrated TRAffic Simulation) model. FRESIM simulates more complex freeway geometrics and provides a more realistic representation of traffic on a freeway than INTRAS. In the 1990s NETSIM and FRESIM were combined to form CORSIM, and the first public release of CORSIM occurred in 1998. Over the years, FHWA has provided significant funding for the development of TSIS-CORSIM and its various components. Numerous universities and software companies have also participated in the development of CORSIM. CORSIM continues to undergo further development, and is currently maintained by the University of Florida's McTrans Center.

== Interoperability ==
TSIS-CORSIM and TRANSYT-7F are now distributed together as one combined product. TRANSYT-7F enhances the traffic signal analysis functionality of CORSIM. CORSIM input files can also automatically be generated by the Highway Capacity Software (HCS) and other third-party products.

== See also ==
- Traffic flow
