= Meadowlands Adaptive Signal System for Traffic Reduction =

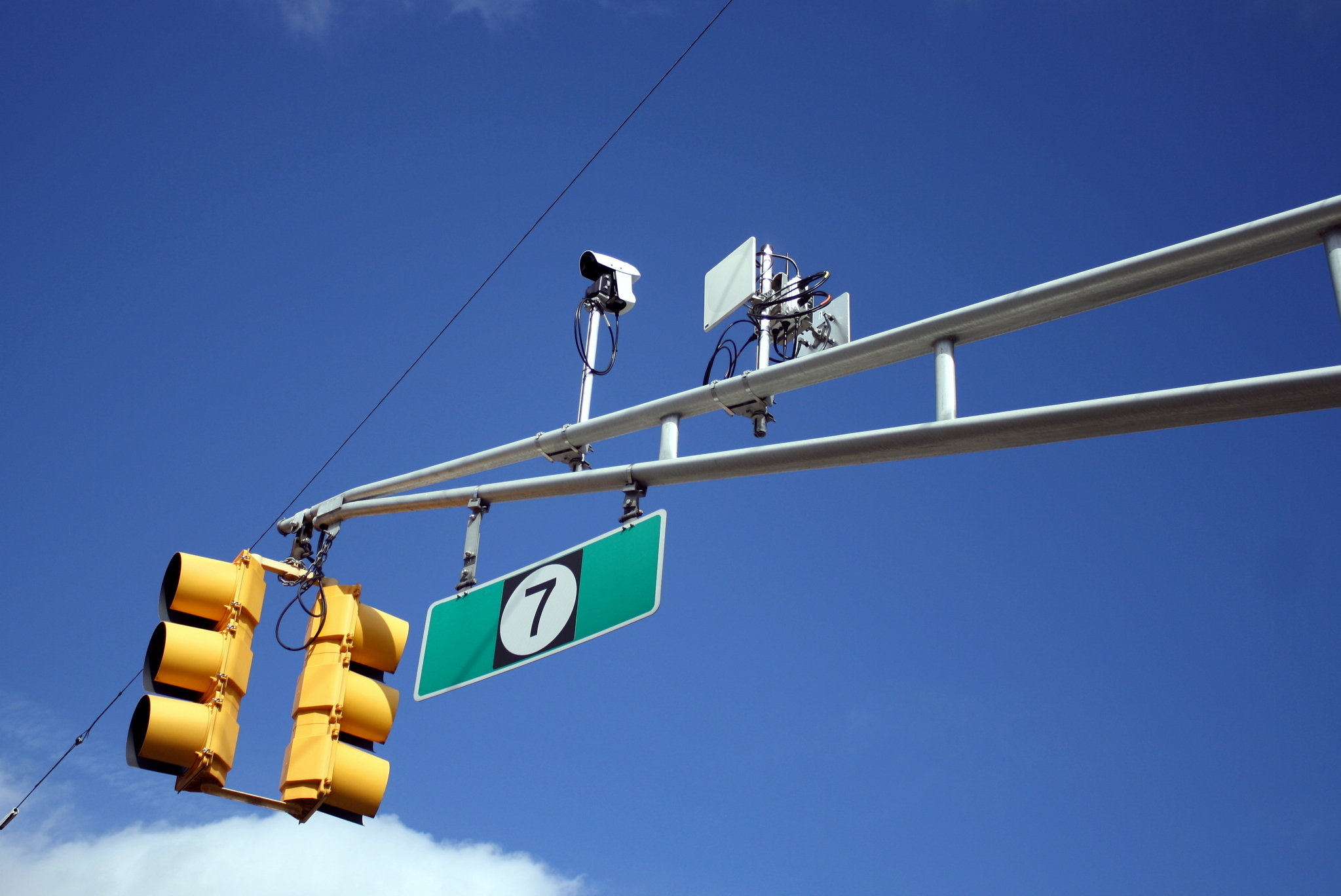
Detection camera and radio on a traffic signal mast arm at intersection with the Belleville Turnpike

The Meadowlands Adaptive Signal System for Traffic Reduction, also known as MASSTR, is an adaptive traffic control system commissioned by the New Jersey Meadowlands Commission (NJMC) for a forty square mile region in the New Jersey Meadowlands. Adaptive Signal Control Technology (ASCT) adjusts the signal timings based upon the flow of traffic instead of utilizing fixed or actuated timings. This regional intelligent transportation system (ITS) incorporates more than 128 traffic signals and serves more than 400,000 vehicles daily. MASSTR is one of a number of ITS projects deployed throughout New Jersey. MASSTR is the fourth-largest deployment of SCATS (Sydney Coordinated Adaptive Traffic System) in the United States.

Adaptive Signal Control Technology continuously coordinates and optimizes traffic signal timings rather than utilizing fixed or actuated timings. Signal timings are optimized across jurisdictional boundaries with a central computer system at a Traffic Management Center in the NJMC Complex. The Meadowlands adaptive system utilizes adaptive traffic signal control software, wireless and fiber optic communications, and vehicle detection cameras, which are coordinated at an NJMC Traffic Management Center.

Installation of the first phase began and was completed in 2012. Construction of phases 2 and 3 were completed in the summer of 2013. All phases are planned to be completed by Summer 2014.

An expansion of the project for the NJ Department of Transportation is currently underway to mitigate future congestion from the closure of the Pulaski Skyway for reconstruction. This expansion will include signals along U.S. 1/9 Truck in Kearny and Jersey City, NJ and NJ Rt. 440 in Jersey City. This expansion of the Meadowlands Adaptive Signal System is the first NJDOT-owned and operated Adaptive Traffic Signal System. The closure of the Pulaski Skyway will affect 67,000 daily crossings.

NJDOT and NJMC expect the Adaptive Traffic Signal Control technology will aid in maximizing the capacity and efficiency of existing travel lanes to handle increased traffic demands due to the Pulaski Skyway reconstruction project when northbound traffic will need to be diverted to alternate routes.

== See also ==
- Mass Transit Super Bowl

== Sources ==
- Frassinelli, Mike (2013-09-05). "During Pulaski Skyway closure, traffic lights to be adjusted on local roads". The Star-Ledger.
- "Traffic Technology Today". Traffic Technology Today.
- "NJMC to deploy adaptive signal control in Hackensack Meadowlands". Road Traffic Technology.
- "New Jersey Meadowlands Commission Deploys TransCore's Adaptive Signal Control System" (Press release). BusinessWire. May 21, 2012.
