= Saturation (traffic) =

Maximum traffic flow of an intersection

In traffic engineering, saturation describes the maximum traffic flow which can be handled by a junction. The saturation flow is the rate at which a continuous flow of vehicles can pass through a constant green signal, typically expressed in vehicles per hour or PCUs per hour.

A formula to calculate saturation flows based on lane geometry is given in Transport and Road Research Laboratory RR67. However, the formula can over-estimate saturation flows at congested locations.

== Degree of Saturation ==
The degree of saturation (DoS) of an intersection (typically under traffic signal control) or a link measures the demand relative to the total capacity. A DoS value of 100% meaning that demand and capacity are equal and no further traffic is able to progress through the junction. The formula to calculate DoS is:

- Degree of saturation = (demand x cycle time) / (saturation flow x effective green time)

Values over 85%-90% typically indicate traffic congestion, with queues of vehicles beginning to form. The practical reserve capacity (PRC) refers to the available spare capacity at a junction.

== Ratio of Flow to Capacity ==
For priority junctions including roundabouts, the equivalent measure to DoS is the ratio of flow to capacity (RFC).
