= Sydney Coordinated Adaptive Traffic System =

Traffic light control system in New South Wales, Australia

The Sydney Coordinated Adaptive Traffic System, abbreviated SCATS, is an traffic light control system and intelligent transportation system platform for monitoring, controlling, and optimising the movement of people and goods in cities through the operation of traffic signals.

SCATS manages the dynamic (on-line, real-time) timing of signal phases at traffic signals, meaning that it tries to find the most efficient phasing (i.e. cycle times, phase splits and offsets) for a traffic situation (for individual intersections as well as for the whole network). SCATS is based on the automatic plan selection from a library in response to the data derived from loop detectors or other road traffic sensors.

SCATS typically uses detectors at each traffic signal to detect vehicle presence in each lane and push-buttons for pedestrians waiting to cross. The vehicle detectors are generally inductive loops installed within the road pavement, but microwave (radar) detectors can be used as a temporary measure when loop detectors fail. Similar loop detectors can detect metal bicycles or metal parts on bicycles. Push button detectors are usually provided for pedestrians. Various other types of sensors can be used for vehicle presence detection, provided that a similar and consistent output is achieved. Information collected from the vehicle sensors allows SCATS to calculate and adapt the timing of traffic signals in the network.

SCATS is installed at more than 63,000 intersections in over 216 cities in 33 countries. In Australia, where the system was first developed, the majority of signalised intersections are SCATS operated (around 11,000).

The SCATS system is owned by the Australian state of New South Wales, the state capital of which is Sydney. Transport for NSW (TfNSW) is the transport and road agency in New South Wales. In December 2019, TfNSW began to look into commercialising the SCATS system, however these plans were abandoned in 2021.

The Transport for NSW Transport Future Sustainability program forecasts SCATS to triple its revenue in 2025-2026.

== Overview ==
Along with Sydney, SCATS is also used in New Zealand, Hong Kong, Shanghai, Guangzhou, Amman, Tehran, Dublin, Rzeszów, Gdynia, Central New Jersey, in part of Metro Atlanta, and Cebu City, among several other places. In Hong Kong, SCATS is currently adopted in the area traffic control systems at Hong Kong Island, Kowloon, Tsuen Wan and Shatin.

The system may be referred to by an alternative name in a specific installation. However, since deployment outside Australia, New Zealand and Singapore, localised names do not appear to be commonly used. The following are some local alternative names that have been or are in use:

- Canberra "CATSS" (Canberra Automated Traffic Signal System)
- Melbourne "SCRAM" (Signal Co-ordination for Regional Areas of Melbourne)
- Adelaide "ACTS" (Adelaide Co-ordinated Traffic Signals)
- Perth "PCATS" (Pedestrian Countdown at Traffic Signals)
- Singapore "GLIDE" (Green Link Determining System)
- Northern Territory "DARTS" (Dynamic Arterial Responsive Traffic System)

== Features ==
=== Default operation ===
The architecture of SCATS is at two basic levels, Tactical control (local) and Strategic control (regional, known as MASTER). The on-site local controller (cabinet at the roadside) processes of traffic information deduced from the vehicle detectors and allocates green time, extending, terminating early, or skipping demand-dependent phases.

Strategic control (regional) is a regional computer which target cycle length, splits, and offsets for subsystems based on detector data. It provides area based traffic control, i.e. area traffic control (ATC) or urban traffic control (UTC). Detailed traffic signal and hardware diagnostics are passed from the LOCAL to the MASTER, with the ability to notify staff when a traffic signal has a fault.

Typical operating modes for SCATS intersections include SCATS Isolated, Flexilink, Masterlink and Non-SCATS sites.

SCATS is able to operate over PAPL, ADSL, PSTN and 3G IP network connections to each intersection. SCATS can also operate on a network of private cables not requiring third party telecommunications support and large parts of inner Sydney previously operated this way.

SCATS increases cycle times to accommodate as much vehicle traffic as possible. The relationship between the Degree of Saturation and Cycle Time is based on two cycle time calibration factors provided by operators.

=== Public vehicle priority ===
Public vehicle priority in SCATS (using data provided from PTIPS) caters for both buses and trams. SCATS has a facility to provide three levels of priority:

- High – In the high priority mode the "hurry call" facility is used. (i.e. the phase needed by a bus, tram or emergency vehicle is called immediately, skipping other phases if necessary)
- Medium (Flexible window) – Phases can be shortened to allow the bus/tram phase to be brought in early. The bus/tram phase can occur at more than one place in the cycle.
- Low – takes its turn.

Trams would normally be given high priority, the aim of which is to get the tram through without it stopping. Buses would normally expect to receive a medium level of priority.

Roads & Maritime Services commissioned Prioritize to develop the SCATS Priority Engine.

PTIPS began as collaboration between the University of Technology and the Roads and Traffic Authority. The basis was developed by Ghassan Jarjees in his doctoral thesis. It was productionised from 2005.

=== Pedestrian and bicycle priority ===
Pedestrian priority can be achieved by using lower cycle times, double cycling, 'Walk for Green', automatic introduction of pedestrian phases, countdown timers, and 'delinking' or 'divorcing'. Lower cycle times reduce the wait time and delay for pedestrians. Other factors impacting pedestrian access include the number of opportunities in the cycle when pedestrian can cross (often one), and pedestrian demands not being recorded in time for action by the signal controller.

SCATS records the first button press for each movement. Later button presses normally add no count. While SCATS records pedestrian demands (which can be accessed from event logs in SCATS History) it does not evaluate pedestrian delay. Setting MSS flags or XSF flags by variation routines can be used to show pedestrian delays.

The SIDRA User Guide states when pedestrians have to wait 20 or 30 seconds (average delay per pedestrian) the delay is noticeable. When the delay is 30-40 seconds there is an increased likelihood of risk taking as the delay is irritating. Risk taking behaviour is likely with a delay of 40-50 seconds and above 60 seconds there is a high likelihood of risk taking as the delay exceeds tolerance level.

SCATS records pedestrians pressing a button, but generally does not count subsequent arrivals. The time of first actuation can be utilised to estimate pedestrian flows and signal delays.

=== Cycle times ===
In SCATS the nominal cycle length (nCL) is a reference in used to set initial splits and coordination. The running cycle length (rCL) varies from cycle to cycle because phase times vary with demand. SCATS can change nCL dynamically. Actual (rCL) cycle times can exceed nominal (nCL) cycle times: an example diagram of nCL vs rCL, including skipped phases, shows actual cycle times (rCL) of between 108 s to 176 s for an intersection with nominal cycle time (nCL) of 140 s.

A graphical program called SCATS History Viewer has export functionality for actual phase and cycle statistics. The program facilitates the extraction of this data into commonly used formats that can be easily consumed by other systems.

Longer or more frequent green signals for pedestrians can reduce unsafe crossing by 34%.

=== Instant fault detection and quick repair ===
The ATC system is equipped with the function of fault detection and logging the fault detected in order to facilitate repair and maintenance. Should there be a telecommunication breakdown, the ATC junction controller concerned will switch to standalone mode and continue to function.

=== Traffic Adaptive Operation ===
ATC systems provide advanced method of traffic signal control called Traffic Adaptive Control where the operational timing plans including cycle length, splits and offsets are continuously reviewed and modified in small increment, almost on a cycle-by-cycle basis, to match with the prevailing demand measured by the detectors connected to the on-street traffic controllers.

=== Simulation ===
SCATS can be simulated in-the-loop (SCATSIM) using third party traffic simulation tools. SCATSIM offers an interface supported by Aimsun, PTV VISSIM, Quadstone Paramics and Commuter. SCATSIM offers kerb-side hardware and firmware emulation that interfaces seamless to the SCATS Region and Central Manager offering the same control strategies used in field deployments for both intersections and ramp metering (SRMS). The configuration files prepared by authorities for the Central Manager, Region, SRMS and kerb-side controllers can be re-used without modification by SCATSIM.

Aimsun has a comprehensive SCATS interface which can be retrieve historical signal data. Aimsun is a simulation program rather than an optimisation program. In 2018, a newly-built interface between Aimsun and SIDRA 8 was published.

When Commuter software was acquired by Autodesk, Azalient Ltd support for the Commuter interface was deprecated. Azalient Ltd also developed a plugin that enabled the Quadstone Paramics interface to SCATSIM. This plugin is also deprecated.

The Sydney Strategic Travel Model was designed by Hague Consulting Group in 1997.

== Products ==
Current SCATS-developed products include SCATS Roadside, SCATS Console and SCATS Data Insights.

In 2026, Control Centre and Data Insights are planned to support Data insights APIs to support external access to road network metrics.

=== SCATS Ramp Metering System ===
The SCATS Ramp Metering System (SRMS) is a SCATS subsystem and controls traffic signals at the entries of motorways and integrates with SCATS intersection control for promoting integrated real-time management of the traffic corridor as a whole. The objective of SRMS, based on current traffic conditions, is to efficiently determine:

- When ramp metering signals start and end ramp metering operation
- The metering flow rates of the operating ramp metering signals
- Which actions shall be taken to signalised intersections of the corridor to promote network-wide benefits.

SRMS achieves these objectives by implementing a collection of pre-configured adaptive intelligent strategies either automatically or manually. In manual mode, the SRMS operator can create new or manipulate existing rules in order to adjust the ramp metering system for effective operation during any planned or unplanned events (e.g. incidents). SRMS is a distributed control system that operates on a central control server and road-side traffic controllers. The central control server is a component of SCATS and inherently provide integrated motorway and arterial real-time management. The road-side controllers are installed on motorway on-ramps and are used to:

- Set the traffic signal times
- Set the state of on-ramp changeable signs
- Manage the sequences start and end ramp metering operation; and
- Measure traffic states using vehicle detectors.

Metering rates are determined by the local traffic signal controller or by the central control server. Metering rates can be determined in two ways:

- adaptive operation, or
- time-of-day-based operation typically when a communications failure or critical vehicle detector failures take place

The adaptive operation optimises mainline traffic state by using real-time data from vehicle detector stations installed at several mainline locations, ramps and optionally at arterial roads. The adaptive operation determines control actions at 10 seconds intervals and applies some or all of the following strategies simultaneously:

- Coordinated ramp metering
- Ramp queue management
- Automatic begin and end of ramp metering operation
- Variation routines for integration with SCATS intersection control
- Variation routines for automated incident responses and unusual circumstances
- Manual controls for incident responses and unusual circumstances
- Critical lane occupancy calibration
- Fault-tolerant strategies
- Data logging for performance reporting and off-line analysis

SRMS is currently used as the Auckland ramp metering system.

== History ==
SCATS was developed in Sydney, Australia by the Department of Main Roads (a predecessor of Transport for NSW).

SCATS was developed out of the Computer Vehicle Control Master (CVCM) pragram. Arthur Sims came up with the name SCATS.

Arthur Sims is often considered 'the father of SCATS'. Early staff instrumental in the development of SCATS were Arthur Sims, Grahame Davis, Peter Lowrie, Ken McCallum and Ken Dobinson. Sims was "headhunted" from the accounting machines division in IBM by Rae French after developing first 8 inner-city coordinated sites commissioned in 1965. Bruce Cliff, a "crash hot best" salesman at IBM, had the idea to put 150 traffic signals in the Sydney central business district and coordinate them. At the time there were 250 policeman inefficiently controlling traffic in the CBD. He talked to Ray French, the chief engineer of the Department of Motor Transport, who was convinced. French and a senior traffic policeman travelled internationally to inspect overseas systems. Their visit included the New York, London, and Frankfurt.

Eight sets of traffic signals were installed along Pitt Street and Castlereagh Street down to Hay Street, operational by 1962.The first 25 sets of signals were commissioned 29 January 1964.

The commercial SCATS website states SCATS was "established in 1975". (Note: An intelligent transportation systems source states development of the SCATS system commenced in 1963 with an 8 intersection coordination system in the Sydney CBD using valve-based (Vacuum tube) IBM equipment. This may state the start of coordinated control, rather than the software algorithm SCATS implements.) An academic source states SCATS was developed in the early 1980s by the Roads & Traffic Authority.

The Sydney Traffic Control Centre had a RAMTEK graphics system since 1983, and other SCATS users in Melbourne, Adelaide, Singapore and Shanghai had also installed RAMTEK systems. Production of intersection and regional graphics pictures on PC based graphics systems was operational by 1989, and subsystem pictures would be finished by March 1990.

In 1988, a pilot scheme for monitoring travel times on Victoria Road was completed. The scheme utilised commercially available vehicle mounted transponders and loop based interrogation equipment installed in existing traffic controllers connected to the SCAT [sic] system. In May 1988 a contract was let with Advanced Systems Research (ASR) for a 150MHz system. A prototype radio system was tested on the Pacific Highway between Turramurra and Crows Nest. It was expected the first of 4000 transponders and 200 interrogators would be delivered in May/June 1990. The RTA was to receive royalty payments, and it was expected many other SCATS users will use the system "yielding substantial financial return to the Authority". The initial ANTTS network was being installed in 1990, with two thousand tags to be installed in taxi-cabs from February 1991. (Note: Author (or listed representative) John Longfoot) ANTTS tags are called VIS tags.

In 1989 a new algorithm was being coded in the SCATS software. The new method of on-line offset calculation was manually tested on Parramatta Road and showed an 8% improvement over the existing precalculated offset plans.

Under STR/14, computer collection of traffic counting at 400 SCATS stations was completed in 1990. (Note: Author (or listed representative) Ray Daltrey)

In 1991, a software consultant was engaged to estimate the effort to convert the system for use under the UNIX computer operating system. It was reported the work would take "about 20 man-years of effort." Initial program development would involve conversion of existing "MACRO assembler code" to the C language, to first be done for the SCATS Central Monitoring Computer (SCMS). (Note: 124)

It began to be used in Melbourne in 1982, Adelaide, South Australia in 1982 and Western Australia in 1983.

In 2003, the RTA developed an Oral History with a section on traffic management, which included recordings of Peter Lowrie discussing SCATS.

In October 2019, it was incorrectly suggested at the 4th International Driverless Vehicle Summit in Sydney that SCATS only has a 20 year history.

SCATS 6.9.4 included the SCATS Spatial Data Interface (SSDI) to replace SCATS Picture, and included hooks to support SPaP and MAP Messages.

== SCATS Traffic Signal Operation ==
=== In New South Wales, Australia ===
Transport for NSW (TfNSW) is responsible for controlling signals in New South Wales, the same agency which develops the SCATS software. As of November 2025, there were 4860 traffic signals across NSW.

In January 2018, Transport for NSW reduced the cycle time for a subset of the Sydney CBD from 110 to 90 seconds. The Lord Mayor of the City of Sydney council wrote to the Roads Minister to request a broader rollout of 90 second cycle times on the 8th of November 2018. The Roads Minister declined to comment on the request.

=== In Western Australia, Australia ===
Main Roads Western Australia previously published a real-time websocket feed of signal timing. As of 2025 WA Main Roads publishes historical SCATS traffic signal phase data under an open source Creative Commons CC BY 4.0 license. Data is published in monthly machine-readable Parquet files. Data includes times for each phase and measured volume.

On the TrafficMap website WA Main Roads openly publish Detector Volume Data, Pavement and Signage Drawings, Traffic Signal Arrangement Drawing, Signal Data (including Phase Times, Pedestrian Phase Times, Special Times, Link and Offset Plans, and SCATS Phase History tables) and Phase Sequence Charts for every signal in the state.

=== In Victoria, Australia ===
The Department of Transport and Planning are responsible for the safety and efficiency of traffic signals throughout Victoria. SCATS was trialled in Melbourne in 1978 and adopted for use throughout Victoria in 1980. In 2018, SCATS controlled more than 4,000 sets of traffic signals across Melbourne and other Victorian rural cities such as Ballarat, Bendigo, Traralgon, Geelong and Mildura.

DataVic publish Traffic Signal Volume Data sourced from the detector loops and the SCATS system under an open-source Creative Commons CC BY 4.0 license. Historical data is published back to 2014. Historical Annual Average Daily Traffic Volume data is published from 2001 to 2019 in the GeoJSON format under CC BY 4.0.

DataVic also publishes Traffic Signal Configuration Data Sheets, also known as 'operation sheets' or 'op-sheets'. These operation sheets detail signal group and detector functions at each intersection along with the phasing of the site. They include detailed notes outlining the specific operation of signal groups, phases, detectors and general site operation, the traffic signal sequences (phases), and the phase and pedestrian time settings which govern how the site operates.

=== In South Australia, Australia ===
The City of Adelaide typically has green walk signals in the range of 5-8 seconds.

Auto pedestrian demand was implemented in the City of Adelaide before 2015. As of March 2025 it is enabled at 49 locations between 7am and 7pm. Some sites, including North Terrace at the Railway Station, and the intersection of King William Street and Rundle Mall and Hindley Street, are enabled 24/7.

A March 2025 review of signal timing along O’Connell Street in North Adelaide in found that reducing the cycle length could reduce the average pedestrian delay by 14 seconds and allow between 6-21 extra opportunities for people walking to cross during midday peak hour. Reducing signal cycle times was also found to reduce queue lengths and reduce average delays for vehicles by 38-46% in the PM and 50-54% in the midday peak.

=== In Queensland, Australia ===
In March 2019, the Minister for Transport and Main Roads announced a $3 million investment for smart technology at up to 300 key pedestrian crossings. The minister stated one-third of all pedestrian fatalities and hospitalisations occurred at intersections. The Brisbane Times described a benefit of the technology as "motorists will no longer be stuck waiting when jaywalkers have crossed early". The Queensland Transport and Roads Investment Program had a $4.5 million line item for "Smart Crossings project, statewide".

By September 2025 the Queensland Government Smart Crossings (SX) Project had installed 112 Smart Crossings at 70 intersections. When radar footpath detectors are used, demand indicators lights (on pedestrian buttons) must be present or installed.

For smart crossings, the flashing red (don't walk) time is calculated using 1.0 m/s where slow walking is not expected to be encountered, or otherwise 0.8 m/s.

=== In Singapore ===
In 1988, SCATS was adopted in Singapore and named GLIDE, replacing a fixed time system.

Singapore has a system called Green Man+ which allows a longer green time for elderly pedestrians (over 60 years old) or people with a disability. Green duration is extended by 3 to 13 seconds depending on the crossing width. Identification cards are required to be tapped onto a reader mounted above signal push buttons. Green light duration is otherwise fixed and pre-determined.

Green Man+ has been installed at over 1,000 crossings and installation of 1500 more is planned by the end of 2027, covering half of pedestrian crossings in all residential estates.

== See also ==
- Traffic light control and coordination
- Traffic signal operation in New South Wales
- PTIPS – works together with SCATS to provide transport vehicles with priority at traffic signals
- Signal timing#Signal Phase and Timing_(SPaT)
- Vehicle-to-everything
- Inductive loop vehicle detection
- STREAMS
- BLISS
- Split Cycle Offset Optimisation Technique (SCOOT)
- City of Moreton Bay#Traffic Signals
- Sidra Intersection
- Aimsun
