= VS-PLUS =

Traffic signal control software

- Developer(s): Verkehrs-Systeme Ltd.
- Stable release: 8.0
- Operating system: OS-9, Linux, Windows
- Type: road traffic control
- License: per controller
- Website: www.vs-plus.com

VS-PLUS is a control method for road intersections controlled by traffic lights. The traffic lights are connected to a controller where VS-PLUS runs as a separate process.

The software is best suited for traffic-actuated control of an intersection. In order to detect the traffic, a sufficient number of detectors must be connected to the controller. The detector signals are typically scanned 10 times per second.

The software is suited as well for implementing public transport priority systems.

VS-PLUS does not provide a programming environment but allows the traffic engineer to parametrize the control. It uses an abstraction model for the necessary parameters such as "desired priority" that can be set as a parameter. VS-PLUS supports the North American NEMA software standard for intersection control.

Due to the parametrization capabilities the software can communicate with central traffic computers and implement their current strategy by parameter changes. This enables re-coordination of a Green Wave still keeping the local optimizations.

During development and test of the parameters, the control can be simulated on a PC using a microscopic traffic simulator (as TSIS-CORSIM, TransModeler, VISSIM, Aimsun Next, or Paramics).

== See also ==
- Traffic engineering
- Road traffic control
