= Traffic signal operation in New South Wales =

Traffic signal operation in New South Wales is the act of traffic management (or active traffic management) in New South Wales, Australia (NSW). Traffic signals in NSW use the Sydney Coordinated Adaptive Traffic System (SCATS) traffic light control and coordination system.

Transport for NSW (TfNSW) is responsible for controlling the signals in NSW, through the Network Operations division. TfNSW also develops the Sydney Coordinated Adaptive Traffic System software, which is deployed in 216 cities in 33 countries.

Smart traffic signal operation delivers substantial economic benefits to Sydney in travel time savings. The savings were estimated to be worth around $3.6 billion per year, compared to simpler traffic signal control.

Personnel specialised in this field may be traffic engineers or traffic signal operations specialists.

As of November 2025, there were 4860 traffic signals across NSW.

== History ==
In 1933, Australia's first traffic lights were installed at the intersection of Market and Kent streets. The next set of signals was installed in 1937.

In the 1960s, intersection number 1 was moved to Strathfield South, at the intersection of the Hume Highway and Pemberton St. It was eventually moved back. (Note: A caller to ABC Radio in 2016 named Alan stated traffic signal numbers are retired if a signal is decommissioned (and they don't come back into service).)

By the 1960s, something had to be done about congestion. In Sydney, most feasible traffic management measures had been implemented, and other measures (like freeways) were too expensive.

In 1963 (or 1964, under the Inner City Signals Project) the Department of Motor Transport introduced television monitoring and computer control to 110 traffic signals with the aim of easing congestion in the CBD. The computer was originally located in the Department of Main Roads building at 309 Castlereagh Street.

Coordinated traffic signals were first trialled on Parramatta Road, unsuccessfully at first. In 1971 there were 13 systems of three or more linked signal sites.

Traffic signal investment was always lacking, but "this was inevitable because of definitional arrangements of "needs"". By the end of 1971, there were 569 intersections controlled by signals and at 263 intersections traffic signals were "warranted".

The 1000th installation of traffic signals in NSW started operation on 8 April 1974.

In 1981, the Traffic and Transport in South Sydney report made a recommendation for "traffic light adjustments to allow longer 'walk' time".

In 1988, a pilot scheme for monitoring travel times on Victoria Road was completed using commercially available vehicle mounted transponders and loop based interrogation equipment installed in existing traffic controllers connected to the SCAT [sic] system. In May 1988 a contract was let with Advanced Systems Research (ASR) for a 150MHz system. A prototype radio system was tested on the Pacific Highway between Turramurra and Crows Nest.

By August 1991 there were 2120 traffic signals at intersections in NSW and 280 at mid-block sites.

Since 1994 automated pedestrian phases were enabled across the CBD from 7am to 7pm on Monday to Thursday, and from 7am to 9pm on Friday.

By December 2009 there were 3791 traffic signals in service in NSW (including mid-block sites).

In 2017, a trial of in-ground traffic signal lights were installed for pedestrians at the intersections of Pitt and Goulburn streets, and Hay and Dixon streets at a cost of $380,000.

In NSW from 2022 to 2024, road crashes at signalised intersections injured 666 pedestrians and resulted in the deaths of 19 people. In 2025, at least 8 pedestrians were killed at traffic lights.

== Operation ==
Transport for NSW aims to allocate physical and temporal road user space equitably between people walking, cycling and private vehicles.

As of April 2026, the design of traffic signal phasing is defined under Transport for NSW standard TS 02670 (TS 02670.1, TS 02670.2, TS 02670.3).

Design objectives for signal phasing include "minimise the cycle time", and aim to achieve the following outcomes in order of priority if compromise "may be needed":

- promote road safety
- minimise delay for active transport
- optimise capacity and reliability
- consistency across the network
- minimises operating costs and road user frustration

The older November 2024 Traffic Signal Operations standard TS 05493 (which is not superseded as of April 2026) does not include objectives but includes "Selection of an appropriate phasing design for a particular intersection is further discussed in relevant parts of TS 02670" This standard superseded RTA-TC-106 version 1.3.

There are subtle differences between the current design and operations standards. The operations standard states that pedestrian clearance (ie. flashing red) time "can represent a significant amount of wasted time that could have been used by vehicle movements" and that "pedestrian movements are usually introduced only by demand" unless in "public transport interchange", "CBD environments", or in places at risk of overcrowding. The design standard states "A pedestrian movement can be automatically introduced without relying on pedestrians to activate the walk signal", makes no mention of "wasted time" and states auto-introduction "should" be implemented where the button is pressed in over 85% of cycles for a period of the day, on high-demand walking routes, or for short parallel marked foot crossings where clearance times are "at or below the intergreen time" for the concurrent (vehicle) phase.

Transport for NSW uses cameras to monitor intersections and adjust signal phases at peak times to prioritise vehicle traffic.

Traffic lights in NSW use a yellow time of between 4.0 and 6.4 seconds, depending on the speed and grade of the road.

In 2026, SCATS history files were utilised to evaluate pedestrian flows and delays at traffic signals across a number of sites in Sydney. Pedestrian flow and delay can be estimated from first-actuation latency.

== Improvements for people walking and cycling ==
A major source of frustration for pedestrians is the phasing of traffic signals. The short time allocated for pedestrians to cross limits pedestrian access and increases increase risk taking when walking.

Simple signal changes can give more time or priority for people to safely cross the road. If people wait too long, they get impatient and step out. About 25% of pedestrian fatalities in NSW are at intersections with signals.

According to the NSW Government, long waits at crossings "reduce how often and how far people are willing to walk – particularly for children and older people – and can increase safety risks." Excessive pedestrian delays "can lead to higher levels of non-compliance with traffic signals", so Austroads recommends "Improve signal timing to reduce pedestrian delays" as a Safe System intervention.

Transport for NSW have improved 560 intersections between 2015 and 2025 to give pedestrians more time to begin crossing, an average of 56 per year. In comparison, Transport for London undertakes "annual timing reviews at 1,200 signal junctions and crossings", with reducing wait time for people walking a measured performance objective.

In 1992, a draft Roads & Traffic Authority report was completed to identify factors "that influence the preparedness of pedestrians to divert from their walk 'desire line' to use a signalised intersection pedestrian facility'. Sites were confined to arterial routes located in retail shopping strings. Papers were planned to be submitted to appropriate transport or engineering journals for publication.

The City of Sydney chairs a "monthly coordination group" with Transport for NSW to facilitate discussions around reducing delays for people walking at signals. The City of Sydney advocates for a target of "a maximum wait time of 45 seconds and a target of 30 second at all signals" and to ensure "15% or less of walking journeys is spent waiting at traffic lights".

In NSW, an intersection may have up to maximum of 8 pedestrian inputs (ie. pedestrian push-button detectors). The 2018 specification TSI-SP-069 required 8 inputs and the 2024 superseding specification TS 06156 states the controller must provide control for 16 pedestrian movements. Controllers have been approved which deviate from the specification.

=== Automatic phase introduction ===
Automatic introduction is the practice for when signals give a green light for pedestrians or cyclists without requiring a button press. Transport for NSW was developing a policy on automated pedestrian crossing signals in March / April 2021. According to a 2024 standard, pedestrian movements are usually introduced on demand as "pedestrian clearance can represent a significant amount of wasted time that could have been used by vehicle movements".

Transport for NSW commenced a broader roll out of automatic pedestrian signals on 23 March 2020. During COVID, pedestrian crossings at traffic lights were automatically activated 24/7 across the CBD and areas of the inner city, including Darlinghurst, Surry Hills, Pyrmont and Ultimo. Automated pedestrian crossings were expanded to key health precincts were also gradually rolled out from March 2020. Automation was not implemented state wide as it "would unnecessarily impact on traffic flow". Automated pedestrian crossing signals were isolated to the Sydney CBD and Hospital locations ("as advice from" NSW Health).

In May 2021, Transport for NSW implemented a trial to automate pedestrian crossing from 7am to 7pm in King Street, Newtown.

In 2022, TfNSW began to remove the pedestrian button covers in Sydney. Crossings around health precincts were no longer automated, however automation remained during daylight hours in the CBD. In the core of the CBD of Sydney, pedestrian signals remain automated during a portion of the day as of 2022.

Due to noise complaints caused by the audio warning when the green man is first displayed, the hours of operation were reduced between November 2022 to January 2023. As of July 2023, in the CBD of Sydney, the pedestrian auto-call feature runs from 6am to 10pm.

In December 2024, Transport for NSW begun investigation of a number of new automated traffic signal locations across 6 Sydney suburbs. The locations were being investigated as of February 2025. In April 2025, a request was made for automation of more locations, and for automation at Harris Street and Broadway to be extended from 7pm to at least 10pm. In March 2025, Transport for NSW completed data collection and planned to automate pedestrian introduction from 7am-7pm at a number of sites "when pedestrian actuation exceeds 85%". If implementation was deemed to affect "traffic efficiency, the changes will be reverted". Arterial roads and corridors were not considered due to "the deterioration of the road capacity resulting from the impacts of the automated introduction."

Automated pedestrian crossings also run on King Street Newtown and the Parramatta CBD. On some key transport routes in the Inner Sydney areas (such as the light rail corridor in Devonshire Street), automated pedestrian crossings do not operate as light rail is the priority mode.

=== Cycle time reductions ===
A 2010 Memorandum of Understanding included an action to reduce signal waiting times for pedestrian priority in the Sydney City Centre during peak pedestrian times, which was due to be finalised by early 2011.

In January 2018, Transport for NSW reduced the cycle time for a subset of the Sydney CBD from 110 to 90 seconds. The Lord Mayor of the City of Sydney council wrote to the Roads Minister to request a broader rollout of 90 second cycle times on the 8th of November 2018. The Roads Minister declined to comment on the request.

=== Removing 'green-on-green' conflicts ===
The NSW Pedestrian Protection Program was launched in August 2015. This involved upgrading SCATS intersections with red turn arrows for vehicles or leading pedestrian intervals (a head start) for pedestrians to increase safety.

At the end of 2019-2020, $7 million had been spent and 528 of 560 locations had been completed under the program. A study conducted from October 2021 to December 2022 found significant reduction in Fatal and Serious Injury pedestrian-involved crashes (between 43% to 47%), as well as a reduction of 20% (not statistically significant) to 38% (statistically significant) in overall pedestrian-involved crashes.

In 2023 Transport for NSW published a summary report on the evaluation of the program. Stakeholders identified that despite initial reservations by some that the implementation may lead to greater vehicular congestion, there was no evidence to suggest this occurred. The Monash University Accident Research Centre assisted with the statistical analysis for the project. The program was discussed at conferences in 2022 and 2023. The program was highlighted in a study conducted under the United States Department of Transportation Federal Highway Administration Global Benchmarking Program.

In November 2024 a funding announcement was made for the upgrade of 174 signalised intersections, including improved pedestrian crossings, new signal installation, and "adjusting left and right-turn signal phasing to provide greater protection for pedestrians while crossing".

The Coalition Congestion Busting Technology Package allocated $400 million to "install intelligent traffic lights" at 500 intersections. This was described in the 2019 budget as a $695 million commitment to be spent on intelligent traffic signals as well as smart M1 motorway from Sydney to Gosford, digital clearway signage, new in-car and GPS technology as well as drones. In October 2023 TfNSW was completing the business case for the Intelligent Traffic Light Program, planned to optimise operation and coordination of 500 traffic signals. The process for intersection selection was described in NSW Parliament Q&A in 2025.

In March to May 2026, red turn arrows were installed at Redfern Street and Chalmers Street, Redfern along with an upgrade of the traffic signal cabinet. Similar works took place nearby at Redfern Street and George Street from April to June 2026.

=== Countdown timers ===
Broadly speaking, there are two types of traffic signal countdown for pedestrian - countdown to the green light or countdown to the red light. Most pedestrian countdown timers in New South Wales show people walking how many seconds until the 'don't walk' (solid red light) is shown. (Note: It is unclear if there is a red countdown timer being installed at in Manly at the intersection of Darley Rd and The Corso between April 12 and June 26 2026, or if this operation was misstated.)

There are installations across a number of NSW suburbs and towns, including the Sydney CBD, Chatswood, Penrith, and Ashfield.

Counting down the flashing red light ("don't walk") was identified as the only practical option for the use of countdown timers in NSW, as SCATS changes the phase durations dynamically to accommodate vehicle traffic. The Roads & Traffic Authority stated in 2009 that the only type of countdown clock that delivers a safety benefit are those which count down until the next pedestrian green light.

Conducting a trial of 'countdown' pedestrian signals in the Sydney CBD was a recommendation of a 2007 bus safety investigation report. Point 8 of 16 of a 2010 Memorandum of understanding between the City of Sydney and Government of New South Wales included a trial of countdown timers.

A number of trial sites in Sydney have countdown timers, where the flashing red (clearance time) is replaced (or in some cases augmented) with an orange countdown number.

A 2011 study included trial sites at the intersection of George Street and Bathurst Street, and at Park Street and Pitt Street. The trial provided "little conclusive evidence" that the safety of pedestrians was improved and there was "no net change in pedestrian safety", however 78% of interviewed respondents felt the countdown made the crossing safer.

On November 2014, countdown timers were installed at six locations across Sydney, Parramatta and Chatswood for a 2 month trial, at a cost of $8000 per site. These timers replaced the flashing red signal.

As of August 2016, pedestrian countdown timers were installed at 35 locations in NSW.

In 2018, the NSW Government committed to installing 30 pedestrian countdown timers across Sydney.

As of March 2026, a trial was underway of countdown timers across Redfern, New South Wales.

=== Bicycle detection cameras ===
The trial evaluates "AI-powered thermal and optical cameras" to detect cyclists at traffic signals.

An early trial site was the intersection of Gardeners Road and Bourke Street in Alexandria, New South Wales. Transport for NSW stated that always providing a green light for bicycles was causing "unnecessary delays on Garden [sic] Road and impacting vehicle traffic flow" (for cars).

Transport for NSW was planning to demonstrate the cameras at the Future Mobility Testing and Research Centre on the Community Open Day in October 2024.

From mid-June 2026, Transport for NSW undertook a trial of bicycle detection cameras at two intersections in Bondi Junction and Surry Hills. Stage 1 involved a smart detection camera, and stage 2 included a bike rider light indicator to provide confirmation when the rider has been detected. Monitoring and collection was expected to continue for 12 weeks.

=== Pedestrian detection cameras ===
A trial of a new sensor at Manly has found longer or more frequent green signals for pedestrians reduced unsafe crossing by 34%. The trial uses a FLIR TrafiOne camera sensor, and has four thresholds. When the pedestrian occupancy is 0-8%, a 6 second green is shown. For 9-15%, 8 seconds, for 16-27% 10 seconds, and for above 28% pedestrian occupancy, 12 seconds green.

A similar infrared camera system will be installed at the intersection of Pitt Street and the Great Western Highway, Parramatta, located near a high school and several apartment buildings. Installation was planned to begin from the week of the 1st of December 2025. The location will expand the trial scope to detect cyclists as well as pedestrians and vehicles. Five cameras will be installed at the north-east, north-west and south-west of the intersection. Changes to increase "operational efficiency" were proposed in August 2017 at this intersection. Modifications to the traffic signal layout at this intersection were made in 2018. Upgrades were complete by July 2018. Signal timing was previously optimised at this intersection in May-June 2025.

== Improvements for buses ==
By implementing bus priority measures and SCATS Priority Engine (SPE), Transport for NSW reduced bus travel times by 15% along the entire T80 bus Transitway corridor (Liverpool to Parramatta) in FY22.

== Improvements for cars ==
SCATS data has been used evaluate how infrastructure delivered under the "Pinch Point Program" increased vehicle traffic flow and reduced congestion. SCATS collects and stores a high volume of network efficiency operation data during normal SCATS operation, which is "readily available". This data was used to construct the Fundamental diagram of traffic flow to evaluate if an intervention increased the flow of vehicle traffic and a reduction in congestion. This analysis stated congestion "change is not stationary over time" which "may be due to the induced demand effect".

From 2022 to 2025, 14 arterial road corridors were optimised in the Sydney Metropolitan area under the intelligent traffic light program.

== Policies ==
The TfNSW Transport Modelling Guidelines state in general for new signals a "Nominal cycle time of 140 sec." should be applied for new signals and "Cycle shorter times than 140 sec may apply to off-peak traffic, to intersections along minor routes, and to isolated intersections."

The SCATSIM modelling methodology requires SCATS data from TfNSW Network Operations, and includes two review stages by TfNSW Network Operations.

=== Data ===
In NSW, a revocable license may be granted to access traffic signal data through the Transport for NSW Traffic Signal Portal. Data is "supplied at the discretion of the TfNSW Director Network Operations" for insurance cases or traffic modelling only.

John Tough stated as the first network manager of Network Operations, he initiated charging for this data. He has publicly explained the rationale.

== See also ==
- Transport for NSW
- Sydney Coordinated Adaptive Traffic System
  - Signal Phase and Timing (SPaT) in NSW
- Variations in traffic light operation
- Traffic light control and coordination
- Traffic signal operations specialist
- Inductive loop vehicle detection
- Split Cycle Offset Optimisation Technique (SCOOT)
- Yutraffic FUSION
