= Alexandre M. Bayen =

French engineer, academic, and researcher

Alexandre Bayen
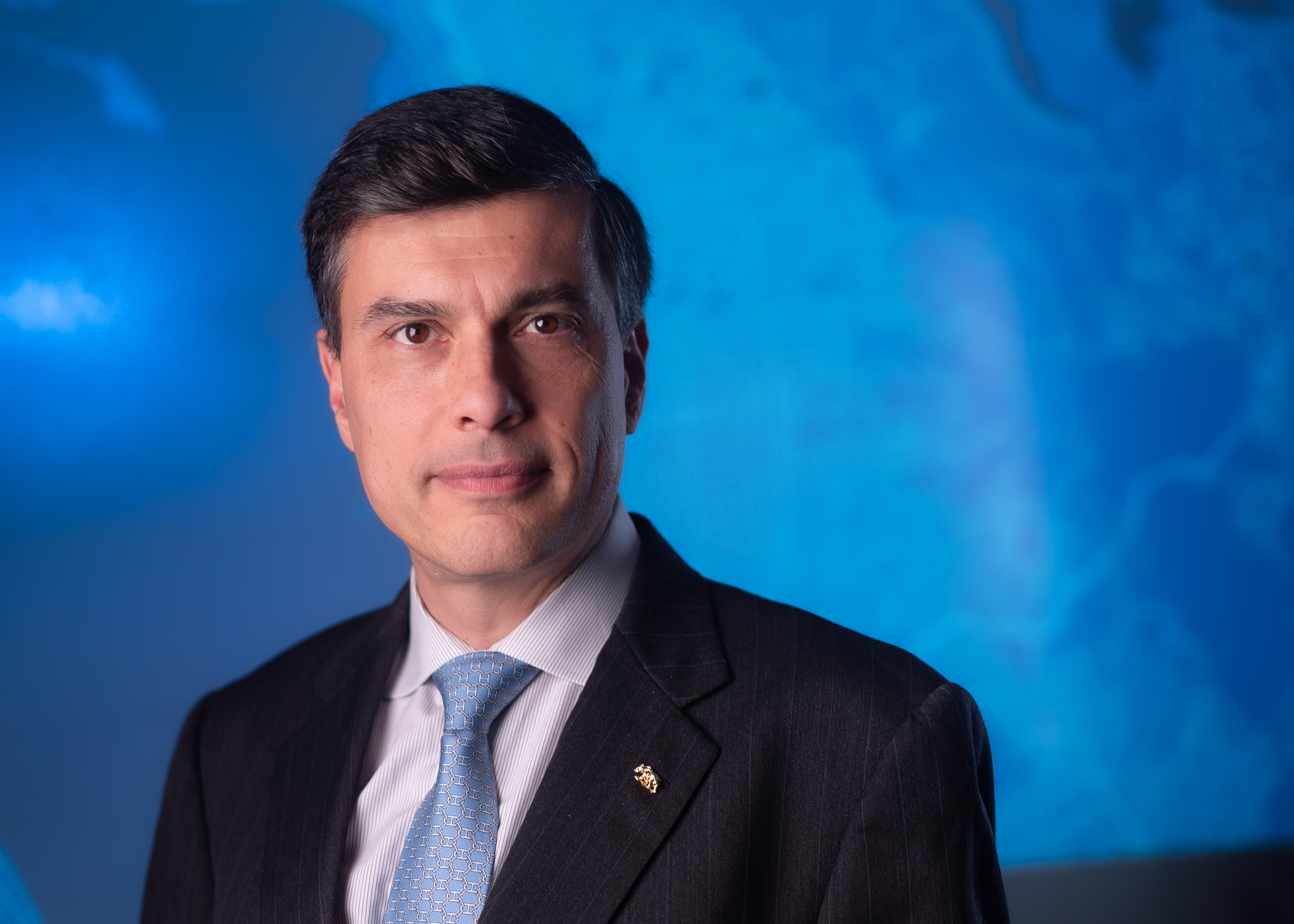
- Born: September 14, 1974 (age 52); Paris, Île-de-France, France
- Citizenship: France
- Education: École Polytechnique Eng. Deg. (1998) Stanford University MS (1999) Stanford University PhD (2004)
- Occupations: Director, Center for Information Technology Research in the Interest of Society (CITRIS) and the Banatao Institute Associate Provost for Berkeley Space Center
- Known for: Control theory, optimization, artificial intelligence
- Awards: See awards section
- Website: https://bayen.berkeley.edu/alex-bayen

Alexandre M. Bayen (born 1974) is a French engineer, academic, and researcher specializing in control theory, optimization, and machine learning with applications in mobile sensing, transportation, and infrastructure systems. He is a professor in the Department of Electrical Engineering and Computer Sciences at the University of California, Berkeley, and in the Department of Civil and Environmental Engineering. He is also the inaugural associate provost for the Berkeley Space Center and director of the Center for Information Technology Research in the Interest of Society (CITRIS) and the Banatao Institute. Bayen is a faculty scientist at the Lawrence Berkeley National Laboratory. Over his career, he has worked in the field of intelligent transportation systems and has contributed to advancements in automated and connected mobility, airspace management, and smart infrastructure.

== Early life and education ==
Born in France in 1974, Bayen attended Lycée Henri-IV and Lycée Louis-le-Grand in Paris. He was admitted to the École polytechnique and trained as a Cadet at the Troisième Bataillon at the Ecole Spéciale Militaire Saint-Cyr Coëtquidan Military Academy, later serving as an Officer Cadet ("Aspirant") in the 6ème Régiment du Matériel in Landau in der Pfalz, Germany. He earned an engineering degree in applied mathematics from École Polytechnique in 1998.

He continued his studies at Stanford University, where he earned an M.S. in Aeronautics and Astronautics in 1999 and a Ph.D. in the same field in 2004. During his doctoral studies, he was a visiting researcher at NASA Ames Research Center (2001–2003), where he focused on control systems applicable to large-scale transportation and airspace systems. His dissertation work contributed to the development of computational techniques for modeling and controlling distributed transportation networks, particularly in optimizing air traffic management and dynamic network flows.

== Academic and research career ==
In 2004, Bayen worked as an engineer at the Délégation Générale de l'Armement, specifically within the Laboratoire de Recherches Balistiques et Aérodynamiques (LRBA) in Vernon, France. In 2005, he joined the University of California, Berkeley, as an Assistant Professor. He received tenure as an Associate Professor in 2010 and was promoted to Full Professor in 2014.

He served as the director of the Institute of Transportation Studies (ITS) at UC Berkeley from 2014 to 2021. Under his leadership, ITS launched several initiatives, including the Berkeley Deep Drive consortium and the Transportation Initiative at the Lawrence Berkeley National Laboratory. He played a key role in securing funding through Senate Bill 1 (SB1), which provided ITS with its first funding increase since its founding in 1947. During this time, he also researched efforts into sustainable urban mobility, working on integrating electric vehicle infrastructure into smart cities and optimizing public transit networks through machine learning algorithms.

In 2019, Bayen became Special Advisor to UC Berkeley Provost Paul Alivisatos and Director of Aerospace Programs at UC Berkeley, and was responsible for leading the academic mission of what later became the Berkeley Space Center at NASA Ames. In 2022, he was appointed the inaugural Associate Provost for the Berkeley Space Center, which was officially launched in 2023. In 2024, he became the director of CITRIS and the Banatao Institute, furthering research into cybersecurity, digital governance, and AI-driven solutions for public systems. His leadership in these roles has helped shape academic-industry partnerships in AI, aerospace, and advanced mobility research.

== Research contributions ==
Bayen's early research emphasizes integrating mobile data in large scale systems models, and operating control on distributed systems with mobile actuators. He has worked on hyperbolic partial differential equations such as the Lighthill-Whitham-Richards equation, and its integral counterpart the Hamilton-Jacobi equation. His work has focused on estimation on these, through a variety of techniques such as ensemble Kalman filtering, convex optimization, and viability theory. He has also worked on neural network approximations of numerical solutions of these equations and comparisons of their performance with PINN and finite difference methods.

An early application of his work was the Mobile Millennium project in 2008, a collaboration with Nokia and NAVTEQ that pioneered the use of GPS-enabled smartphones for traffic monitoring. Together with Nokia, his team developed the first traffic app to run on Symbian and RIM smartphones to collect crowdsourced data from phones for traffic information systems.

Later examples included the iShake app, which was the first mobile app to monitor earthquakes from smartphones, tested on shake tables in 2013, and the floating sensor network in 2014, a set of 100 mobile floating and motorized sensors equipped with Android phones, deployed in the Sacramento Delta to measure the tidal forcing of the currents in the Georgiana Slough.

Bayen subsequently led the Connected Corridors project for the California Department of Transportation (District 7), from which microsimulation models of the I210 led to the launch of the FLOW project. FLOW, released in 2017, was the first integration of microsimulation tools (SUMO and Aimsun) with early deep reinforcement learning libraries (RLlib and rllab) implemented on the cloud (AWS and Azure). The project ultimately led to the launch of the CIRCLES consortium, which successfully tested algorithms on 100 semi-automated vehicles deployed simultaneously in November 2022 on a stretch of the I24 freeway in Nashville, TN, to demonstrate flow smoothing. During the test, nicknamed the "MegaVanderTest", the 100 vehicles successfully smoothed stop-and-go waves, while being monitored by the I24 MOTION testbed, which launched that same week.

Bayen has authored over 300 peer-reviewed publications and co-authored or edited five books. His research has been cited extensively in fields such as mobility-as-a-service, smart logistics, and transportation sustainability. His ongoing work explores digital twins for smart cities, AI-based transportation optimization, and next-generation urban mobility frameworks.

== Industry contributions ==
Bayen co-founded the company SafelyYou with UC Berkeley students George Netscher, Julien Jacquemot and Pulkit Agrawal in 2015. SafelyYou was among the first companies to perform vision-based automated fall detection for assisted living. He served as Chief Scientist of SafelyYou until 2018.

He has also collaborated with companies such as Uber, where he contributed to the development of BISTRO, an agent-based simulation framework. From 2021 to 2023, he worked at Google Research on routing problems and game-theoretic approaches in transportation.

In 2019, with a team from Oliver Wyman, he launched the Urban Mobility Readiness Index at the World Economic Forum in Davos, Switzerland. The index has been published every year and ranks 70 cities around the world based on the efficiency, sustainability, and innovation of their urban mobility ecosystems. He has also served as an expert consultant for several multinational corporations and government agencies, advising on AI-driven mobility planning, digital infrastructure, and cybersecurity for transportation networks.

== Professional memberships and service ==
Bayen is an IEEE Fellow, and was an AIAA and ASCE member for several years. He has chaired several international conferences, including the IEEE Intelligent Transportation Systems Conference (2019), in Maui, Hawaï, and the International Conference on Cyber Physical Systems (2015), in Seattle, WA.

== Awards and honors ==
- Ballhaus Prize, Stanford University, 2004
- CAREER Award, National Science Foundation, 2009
- Presidential Early Career Award for Scientists and Engineers (PECASE), The White House, 2010
- Antonio Ruberti Young Researcher Prize, IEEE, 2013
- Okawa Foundation Research Award, 2013
- Best Application Paper Award, 9th IEEE CASE Conference, 2013
- Walter L. Huber Civil Engineering Research Prize, ASCE, 2014
- Liao-Cho Innovation Endowed Chair, 2015
- EECS Distinguished Teaching Award, EECS Department, UC Berkeley, 2015
- NAE Gilbreth Lecture, 2017
- IEEE TCCPS Mid-Career Award, 2018
- IEEE Fellow, 2023
- IEEE Control Systems Society Transition to Practice Award, 2024
- IEEE ITS Outstanding Research Award, IEEE Intelligent Transportation Systems Society (ITSS), 2024
- IEEE ITS Institutional Lead Award, IEEE Intelligent Transportation Systems Society (ITSS), 2024
- Doctor Honoris Causa, TU Delft, The Netherlands, 2025

== Books ==
- Pandemic in the Metropolis: Transportation Impacts and Recovery, A. Loukaitou-Sideris, A. Bayen, G. Circella, R. Jayakrishnan, Springer International Publishing, First Edition, 2022, ISBN 978-3-031-00148-2.
- Control Problems for Conservation Laws with Traffic Applications: Modeling, Analysis, and Numerical Methods, (link is external)A. Bayen, M. Delle Monache, M. Garavello, P. Goatin, B. Piccoli, Springer International Publishing, First Edition, 2022, ISBN 978-3-030-93017-2.
- Python Programming and Numerical Methods A Guide for Engineers and Scientists, (link is external)Q. Kong, T. Siauw, and A. Bayen, Elsevier, Academic Press, First Edition, 2020, ISBN 978-0-128-19550-5.
- An Introduction to MATLAB Programming and Numerical Methods for Engineers, T. Siauw and A. Bayen, Academic Press, First Edition, Elsevier, 2014, ISBN 978-0-124-20228-3.
- Viability Theory: New Directions, J.-P. Aubin, A. Bayen and P. Saint-Pierre, Springer-Verlag, Second Edition, 2011, ISBN 978-3-642-16683-9.
