= STREAMS Integrated Intelligent Transport System =

Enterprise traffic management system

STREAMS Integrated Intelligent Transport System is an enterprise traffic management system designed to operate in the Microsoft Windows environment. Like most traffic management systems, STREAMS is an array of institutional, human, hardware, and software components designed to monitor, control, and manage traffic on streets and highways. Advanced traffic management systems come under the banner of ITS (intelligent transport systems). ITS is the application of information and communications technology to transport operations in order to "reduce operating costs", "improve safety" and "maximize the capacity of existing infrastructure". STREAMS provides traffic signal management, incident management, motorway management, vehicle priority, traveler information, flood monitoring and parking guidance within a single integrated system is what the product says. STREAMS is developed by Transmax.

== History ==
In 1969, the Department of Main Roads (Queensland) installed the first Intelligent Transport System in Australia (located at Surfers Paradise).

In 1985, a second-generation traffic management system was installed in Cairns, Australia. This was known as the TRAC System, or Traffic Responsive Adaptive Control System. Progressive installation of the TRAC system followed at several more sites around Queensland including the capital city, Brisbane.

In 1988, a traffic management system was installed for the South East Freeway in Brisbane, Australia. The features included were ramp metering and graphical displays of traffic conditions. It also provided automatic incident detection.

In 1992, a new integrated intelligent transport system development was commenced. The objectives were to lower ongoing costs while providing increased performance and opportunity for future ITS applications. The resulting system was STREAMS.

In 2002, the division of Department of Main Roads (Queensland) responsible for continuing development of STREAMS was reorganized to form Transmax. The company remains 100% owned by the Queensland Government Department of Transport and Main Roads.

In April 2007, Transmax in partnership with VicRoads implemented a coordinated ramp metering trial in Melbourne, Victoria on a 15 km section of the Monash Freeway. Later that year, in December, VicRoads installed STREAMS to manage another six ramps.

These developments were part of a much larger M1 Upgrade Project that continued over the next three years, eventually winning the 2010 National ITS Australia Award. The project to upgrade the 75-kilometre M1 Freeway, increased the capacity and safety of the Monash Freeway, the CityLink Tollway (Southern Link) and the West Gate Freeway utilising STREAMS as the Integrated Control System.

== Software Architecture ==
STREAMS employs a distributed computing software architecture. Field hardware such as intersection controllers, video cameras and speed detectors are connected via field processors back to a central application server. Users connect to the application server via the workstation software. Field communications are via Optical Fibre, DSL, or Wireless connections.

The software is built in distinct modules for each distinct area of traffic / transport control and monitoring. The workstation software communicates to the application server software via a publisher / subscriber model (i.e. workstations subscribe to specifically requested streams of data which are published by the application server).

The software architecture model is designed to support the software's claim of being an "integrated" Advanced Traffic Management System.

The transport network data is set up via a GIS (Geographic Information System). The GIS allows for a graphical user interface displaying transport network data overlaid on street maps and updating in real-time.

== Adaptive Traffic Management ==
STREAMS implements adaptive traffic management through a feature called "Dynamic Plan Selection". Depending on the density of traffic (occupancy) and the dominant direction of traffic (for example, inbound, outbound, or bidirectional) on a road, nearby signalised intersections are operated using several predefined traffic plans. A user sets up the signal timing and picks the traffic density levels and direction that they apply to. Selecting the appropriate signal timing is then automatic. When a time-based traffic plan schedule would be inappropriate because of varying traffic levels, STREAMS Dynamic Plan Selection can adapt to unexpected traffic levels as they arise.

With help from the academic community, STREAMS Smart Freeways offers the coordinated ramp-metering algorithm suite ALINEA/HERO. The modular architecture of STREAMS allows Transmax to integrate new algorithms as they become available. STREAMS applies the computed metering rates using ramp signal controllers deployed at the roadside. Controlling multiple consecutive ramps, ideally the whole freeway, makes it possible to maintain a more consistent freeway flow and prevent flow breakdown. Using HERO, STREAMS is able to balance queues across multiple ramps and maximise freeway performance.

== See also ==
- Traffic Management System
- Intelligent Transport Systems
- SCATS
- BLISS
- Geographic Information System
- ITS Australia
