= Vissim =

Vissim may refer to:

- VisSim, a visual block diagram language for model-based simulation and embedded development
- PTV Vissim, a microscopic multi-modal traffic flow simulation software package
