= Paramics Discovery =

Paramics
- Developers: Quadstone, now Systra
- Stable release: 24 / September 2020
- Operating system: Windows
- Type: Traffic Software
- License: Software license agreement

Paramics is traffic microsimulation software, originally developed by Quadstone Ltd. There is a related pedestrian microsimulation product called the Urban Analytics Framework.

== Background ==
The Paramics project was originally established in the early 1990s by the UK Department for Transport and was further developed as a project by the Edinburgh Parallel Computing Centre, based at the University of Edinburgh.

By the mid 1990s, some of the project staff left to form Quadstone Limited. A partnership was formed between Quadstone Limited and SIAS but was quickly dissolved in 1998 as both parties could not agree on the direction of the partnership.

In 2005, Quadstone was acquired by Portrait Software. Today, Quadstone Paramics operates as an autonomous division within Pitney Bowes Business Insight.

The software evolved into Paramics Discovery which is now managed by Systra.

== Concept ==
Paramics was created from scratch based on several models and mainly on the paper “A model for traffic simulation” by Hans-Thomas Fritzsche. Paramics uses the car-following and lane-changing model to show the correlation of numerical data for road networks under differing conditions through the use of computer graphics.

A Paramics model is represented by a combination of nodes, links and other associated objects to replicate real life geometry constraints. Upon release from an “origin zone”, each vehicle attempts to complete its journey towards a “destination zone” whilst being bounded by physical and dynamic vehicle parameters.

Through the use of microsimulation, Paramics allows users to simulate individual vehicle movements to predict future travel pattern behaviour as a result of a change in traffic volume or geometric road layout.

Several plug-ins were developed in the early 2000s by researchers at the University of California, Irvine for the California Department of Transportation. The plug-ins were developed using APIs, and included actuated signal, multiple actuated signal timing plan, actuated signal coordination, detector data aggregator, ramp metering control, on-ramp queue override control, ALINEA ramp metering control, BOTTLENECK ramp metering control, SWARM ramp metering control, and Freeway MOE.

== Traffic simulation ==
Compared to traditional empirical modelling which is based on an aggregated representation of traffic, microsimulation allows for real time vehicle movement and is able to simulate queuing conditions for congested networks.

The software is used by government agencies, consultancies and universities for the purpose of simulating and analyzing existing traffic and transportation problems. The software has been designed to handle various scenarios which include:

- Environment and Emissions
- Freeways and Highways
- Intelligent Transport Systems (ITS)
- Public Transport
- Roundabouts and Complex Junctions
- Toll Plazas
- Traffic Engineering

== Pedestrian simulation ==
The Urban Analytics Framework is a microsimulation software developed to simulate pedestrian behavior in real world environments. The software is used in shared space designs to investigate road safety issues and to quantify potential conflicts between vehicles and pedestrians.

The software is used by the public and private sector to conduct shared space designs between vehicle and pedestrian interaction [20]. The software has been designed to simulate different pedestrian scenarios which include:

- Pedestrian crossing Facilities
- Public Transport terminals
- Safety and Accident Prevention
- Shared space design
- Special events

== Literature ==
- Henry X. Liu, Wenteng Ma, Jeff X. Ban & Pitu Mirchandani “Dynamic Equilibrium Assignment with Microscopic Traffic Simulation” IEEE Conference on Intelligent Transportation Systems, Vienna, Austria, September 13–16, 2005
- Henry X. Liu, Lianyu Chu, & Will Recker . “Dynamic Path-Based Equilibrium Assignment With Microscopic Traffic Simulation”. UC Berkeley: California Partners for Advanced Transit and Highways (PATH) (2005).
- Henry X. Liu, Lianyu Chu, Michael McNally & Will Recker. "Development of the Capability-Enhanced PARAMICS Simulation Environment". UC Berkeley: California Partners for Advanced Transit and Highways (PATH) (2005).
- Timothy Oketch, Ph.D., Mike Delsey & Doug Robertson. “Evaluation of performance of modern roundabouts using paramics micro-simulation model”. TAC 2004 Annual Conference, Quebec City, September 19 to 22, 2004
- Reinaldo C. Garcia. “Implementing A Dynamic O-D Estimation Algorithm within the Microscopic Traffic Simulator Paramics”. UC Berkeley: California Partners for Advanced Transit and Highways (PATH)( 2002).
- Henry X. Liu, Lianyu Chu, & Will Recker. “Paramics API Development Document for Actuated Signal, Signal Coordination and Ramp Control”. UC Berkeley: California Partners for Advanced Transit and Highways (PATH) (2000).
- Choon Heon Yang & Amelia Regan. “Prioritization of Potential Alternative Truck Management Strategies Using the Analytical Hierarchy Process” Transportation Research Board 88th Annual Meeting, Washington DC, 11 jan – 15 January 2009
- Mohamed A Abdel-Aty & Vikash Gayah. “Comparison of Two Different Ramp Metering Algorithms for Real-Time Crash Risk Reduction” Transportation Research Board 87th Annual Meeting, Washington DC, 13–17 January 2008
- Mohamed A Abdel-Aty & Vikash Gayah. “Route Diversion as Real-Time Crash Prevention Strategy on Urban Freeways” Transportation Research Board 87th Annual Meeting, Washington DC, 13–17 January 2008
- Hoda Talaat, Mohamed Masoud & Baher Abdulhai. “Simple Mixed Reality Infrastructure for Experimental Analysis of Route Choice Behavior: Applications of Intelligent Transportation Systems” Transportation Research Record: Journal of the Transportation Research Board, Volume 2086 / 2008
- Kanok Boriboonsomsin & Matthew Barth. “Impacts of freeway high-occupancy vehicle lane configuration on vehicle emissions” Transportation Research Part D: Transport and Environment Volume 13, Issue 2, March 2008, Pages 112-125
