= Ramp meter =

Traffic management system

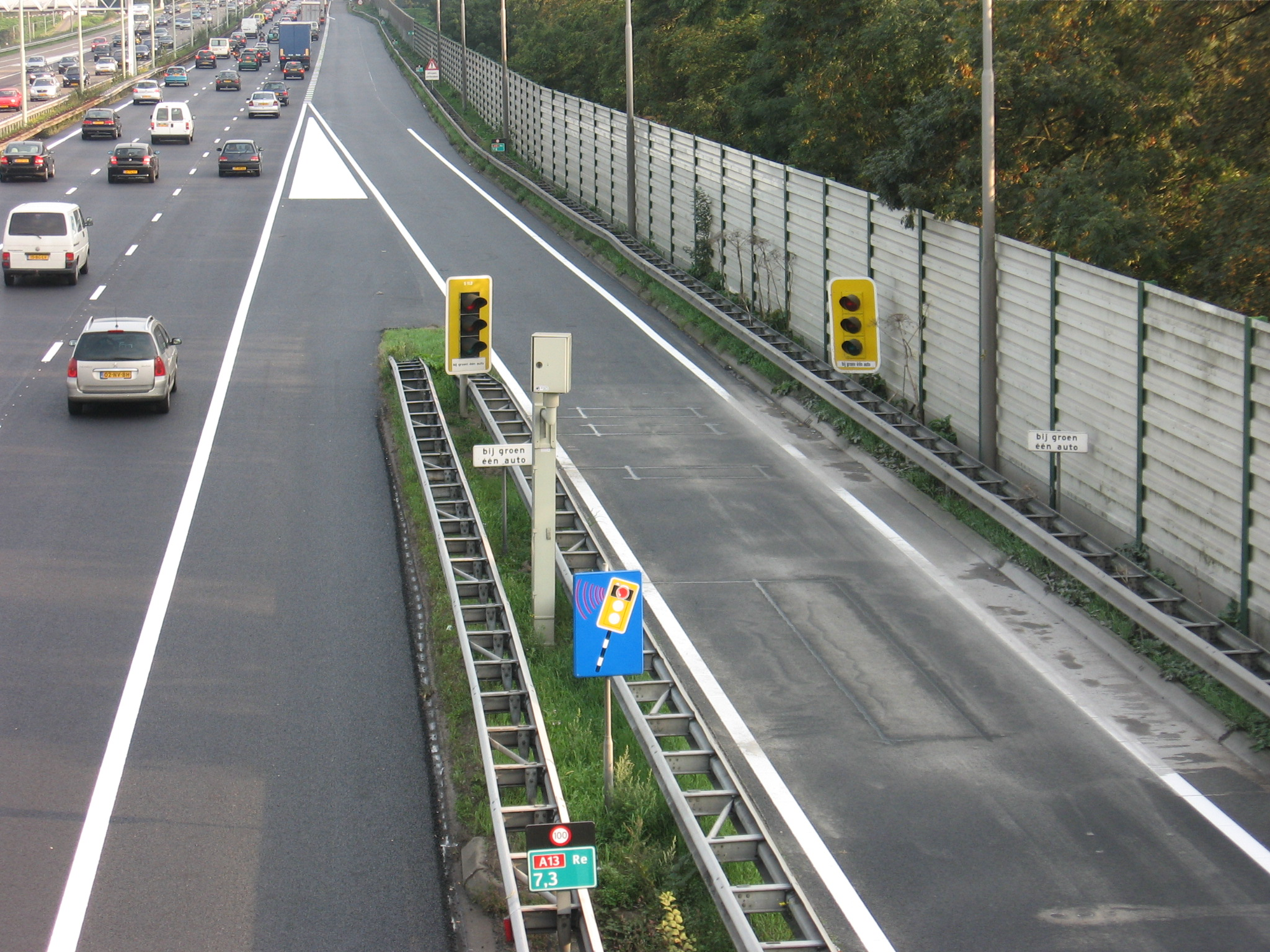
Metered ramp on the A13 motorway in Delft

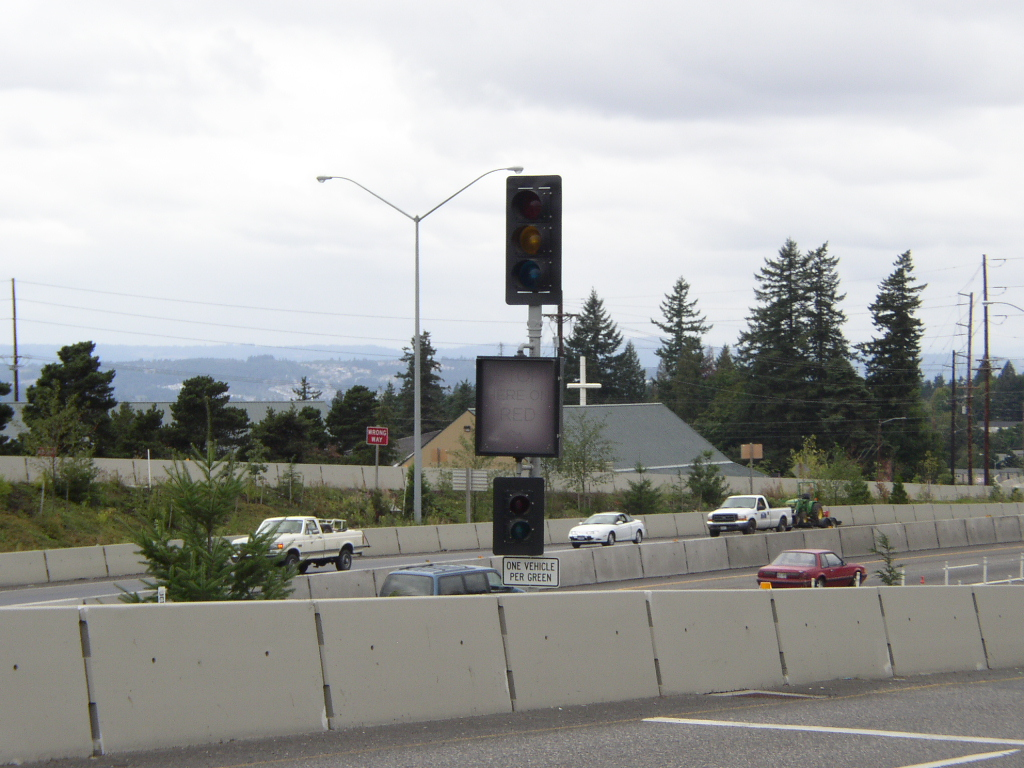
A Portland, Oregon ramp meter

A ramp meter, ramp signal, or metering light is a device, usually a basic traffic light or a two-section signal light (red and green only, no yellow) together with a signal controller, that regulates the flow of traffic entering freeways according to current traffic conditions. Ramp meters are used at freeway on-ramps to manage the rate of automobiles entering the freeway. Ramp metering systems have proved to be successful in decreasing traffic congestion and improving driver safety.

Ramp meters are claimed to reduce congestion (increase speed and volume) on freeways by reducing demand and by breaking up groups of cars. Two variations of demand reduction are commonly cited; one being access rate, the other diversion. Some ramp meters are designed and programmed to operate only at times of peak travel demand; during off-peak times, such meters are either showing a steady green, flashing yellow (Maryland), or are turned off altogether. This allows traffic to merge onto the freeway without stopping. Other ramp meters are designed to operate continuously, only being turned off for maintenance or repairs.

== Types ==
Some metered ramps have bypass lanes for high-occupancy vehicles, allowing carpools, buses, and other eligible vehicles to skip the queue and get directly on the highway. In other places such as Northern California, carpool lanes are still metered, but the queue is typically shorter in comparison to regular lanes. Meters often only operate in rush hour periods. Some ramp meters have only one lane of traffic at the signal; others may have two or more lanes of traffic. Generally, meters with multiple lanes only give one lane the green light at a time. In one common configuration, each entrance lane has two signals; a red-yellow-green signal perched overhead over each lane (or mounted high on a pole for a single lane), and a two-phase lamp mounted low on a pole next to the stop line.

The overhead lights are for cars approaching the metering point; the low-mounted two-phase lights are intended to be used by the vehicle at the front of the queue. In normal operation of the ramp meters, only the red and green lamps are used. However, when ramp metering is about to be enabled, the overhead lamps may show flashing or solid yellow to warn drivers to prepare to stop. (Once ramp metering is turned on, there is no further need for the yellow lamp.) In California, some meters allow two or three cars to proceed on a green light. These meters use red-yellow-green signals on both the upper and lower mounts on the pole, and operate in a standard green-yellow-red fashion.

In Ontario, the ramp meter lights are always green when there are no restrictions in place for traffic to proceed.

The sophistication and extent of a ramp metering system is based on the amount of improvement desired, existing traffic conditions, installation costs, and the continuing resource requirements that are necessary to operate and maintain the system effectively. The simplest form of control is a fixed time operation. It performs the basic functions of breaking up platoons into single-vehicle entries and setting an upper limit on the flow rates that enter the freeway. Presence and passage detectors may be installed on the ramp to actuate and terminate the metering cycles, but the metering rate is based on average traffic conditions at a particular ramp at a particular time. This type of operation provides the benefits associated with accident reductions, but is not as effective in regulating freeway volumes because there is no input about mainline traffic. Pre-timed control can be implemented on any number of ramps, and is often implemented as an initial operating strategy until individual ramps can be incorporated into a traffic responsive system.

The next level of control, traffic responsive, establishes metering rates based on actual freeway conditions. The local traffic responsive approach utilizes detectors and a micro-processor to determine the mainline flow in the immediate vicinity of the ramp and the ramp demand to select an appropriate metering rate. Traffic responsive control also permits ramp metering to be used to help manage demand when incidents occur on the freeway, i.e. reduce the metering rate at ramps upstream of the incident and increase the rate at ramps downstream.

System-wide control is a form of traffic responsive control but operates on the basis of total freeway conditions. Centralized computer controlled systems can handle numerous ramps in a traffic responsive scheme and feature multiple control programs and overrides. Control strategies can also be distributed among individual ramps. A significant feature of system control is interconnection that permits the metering rate at any ramp to be influenced by conditions at other locations. Denver showed that this type of control has significant benefits when properly applied.

System control need not be limited to the freeway and its ramps. The concept of integrated traffic control combines or coordinates freeway and arterial street control systems to operate on the basis of corridor wide traffic conditions. The potential advantages of integrated control include reduced installation and operating costs, corridor wide surveillance, better motorist information, and quicker and coordinated use of all of the control elements (meters, signals, signs, etc.) in response to real time traffic conditions. Simulation results from one study showed that, during an incident, coordination of arterial traffic signals and ramp meters can improve the traffic performance of a corridor.

== Ramp metering signal controls ==
Ramp meter signals are set according to the current traffic conditions on the road. Detectors (generally an induction loop) are installed in the road, both on the ramp and on the main road which measure and calculate the traffic flow, speed and occupancy levels. These are then used to alter the number of vehicles that can leave the ramp. The more congested the main freeway, the fewer vehicles are allowed to leave the ramp, this is effected by giving longer red times to the traffic signals.

Much research is currently being carried out into the most appropriate algorithms for controlling ramp meter signals. Some algorithms that are in use or have been evaluated are ALINEA, demand control and fuzzy algorithms.

=== Demand control algorithms ===
The demand control algorithms are examples of feed-forward control. One version of the demand control algorithm is the RWS strategy used in the Netherlands. In this algorithm the number of vehicles that the signals allow off the ramp is calculated as the difference between the flow before the ramp and the pre-specified capacity of the road.

== Ramp metering in North America ==
This first application involved a police officer who would stop traffic on an entrance ramp and release vehicles one at a time at a predetermined rate, so that the objectives of safer and smoother merging onto the freeway traffic was easier without disrupting the mainline flows.

Ramp metering was first implemented in 1963 on the Eisenhower Expressway (Interstate 290) in Chicago by Adolf D. May.

Development in systems control theory allowed for improved traffic regulation throughout the early 1970s, pioneered by Leif Isaksen in his paper "Suboptimal Control of Large Scale Systems with Application to Freeway Traffic Regulation." Since then ramp-meters have been systematically deployed in many urban areas including Los Angeles; San Diego; Sacramento; the San Francisco Bay Area; Fresno; Philadelphia, Pennsylvania; Seattle; Spokane; Denver; Phoenix; Las Vegas; Salt Lake City; Portland, Oregon; Minneapolis-St. Paul; Milwaukee; Indianapolis; Columbus; Cincinnati; Houston; Atlanta; Miami; Orlando; Washington, DC (only along Interstate 270 in Montgomery County, Maryland and Interstate 395 and Interstate 66 in Arlington County, Virginia); Kansas City, Missouri; and along the Queen Elizabeth Way in Mississauga, Ontario (Toronto-bound ramps from Cawthra Road, Hurontario Street, Mississauga Road, Erin Mills Parkway, Winston Churchill Boulevard, Ford Drive) Canada since the 1970s. In the early 1970s, this traffic control practice drew the attention of the U.S. Environmental Protection Agency, which was looking for innovative ways to reduce air pollution in California by make the transportation system more effective.

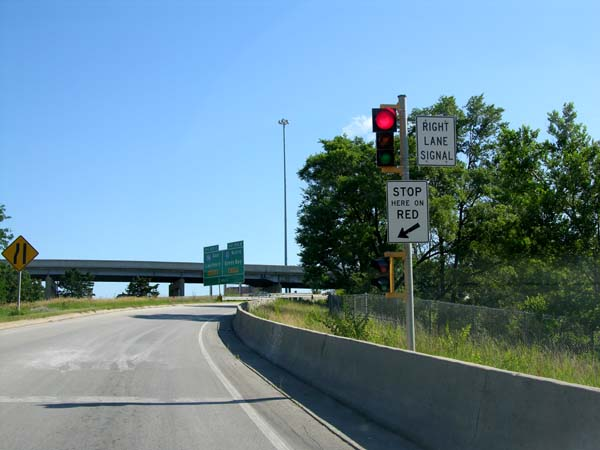
A Milwaukee, Wisconsin ramp meter

Ramp meters are commonplace in the New York City, Los Angeles, San Francisco, Chicago, Seattle, Phoenix, Houston, Atlanta, Milwaukee, Columbus, and Minneapolis-St. Paul metropolitan areas, and they are also found in more than two dozen smaller metropolitan areas. In the New York City metro area, locals refer to ramp meters as "merge lights" and in Houston they're known as "flow signals."

Ramp meters have been withdrawn after initial introduction in several cities, including Dallas, San Antonio, and Austin, Texas. Disused metering signals can still be found along some parkways surrounding New York City and Detroit. Although deactivated shortly after they were added, ramp meters have been reactivated at select interchanges of Interstate 476 in suburban Philadelphia.

Ramp meters were installed along Interstate 435 in Overland Park, Kansas and Kansas City, Missouri in 2009. In 2017, ramp meters were installed along Interstate 35 in Kansas City.

Ramp meters in Mississauga, Ontario are designed in such a way so that if the queue waiting to enter the QEW grows to the point where it may back up onto city streets, the meter is lifted and all traffic entering the highway is able to move freely without waiting for the meter. The meter goes back into service once the ramp queue is reduced to a reasonable level. While this method may increase congestion on the highway itself, it has the benefit of keeping city arterials free of stopped traffic waiting in queue. Ramp queues are usually quite short, lasting only 5–6 seconds on average before the driver may continue to the freeway.

=== Minneapolis–Saint Paul ramp meter experiment ===
In 2000, a $650,000 experiment was mandated by the Minnesota State Legislature in response to citizen complaints and the efforts of State Senator Dick Day. The study involved shutting off all 433 ramp meters in the Minneapolis-St. Paul area for eight weeks to test their effectiveness. The study was conducted by Cambridge Systematics and concluded that when the ramp meters were turned off freeway capacity decreased by 9%, travel times increased by 22%, freeway speeds dropped by 7% and crashes increased by 26%. However, ramp meters remain controversial, and the Minnesota State Department of Transportation has developed new ramp control strategies. Fewer meters are activated during the course of a normal day than prior to the 2000 study, some meters have been removed, timing has been altered so that no driver waits more than four minutes in ramp queue, and vehicles are not allowed to back up onto city streets.

=== Mainline metering ===
A mainline meter throttles traffic flow from one segment of a highway to the next by directly metering the highway's traffic. Such a scheme is typically implemented in specialized situations such as bridges and tunnels. A mainline meter was installed at the San Francisco–Oakland Bay Bridge toll plaza in the early 1970s. Similar mainline meters have also been installed downstream from the toll plazas at two other San Francisco Bay crossings, the San Mateo Bridge and the Dumbarton Bridge. However, these mainline meters have not yet been activated (as of September 2006). A mainline meter also exists on California State Route 125 southbound at its junction with Interstate 8 in La Mesa, California.

== Ramp metering in Europe ==
Ramp metering has been installed in several countries in Europe, including the United Kingdom, Germany and the Netherlands. A research project, EURAMP - European Ramp Metering Project, funded by the European Union was completed in March 2007. The EURAMP Project Deliverables included information about the results of ramp metering in a number of locations and situations, and whether they were helpful in those situations, and a Handbook of ramp metering.

=== United Kingdom ===
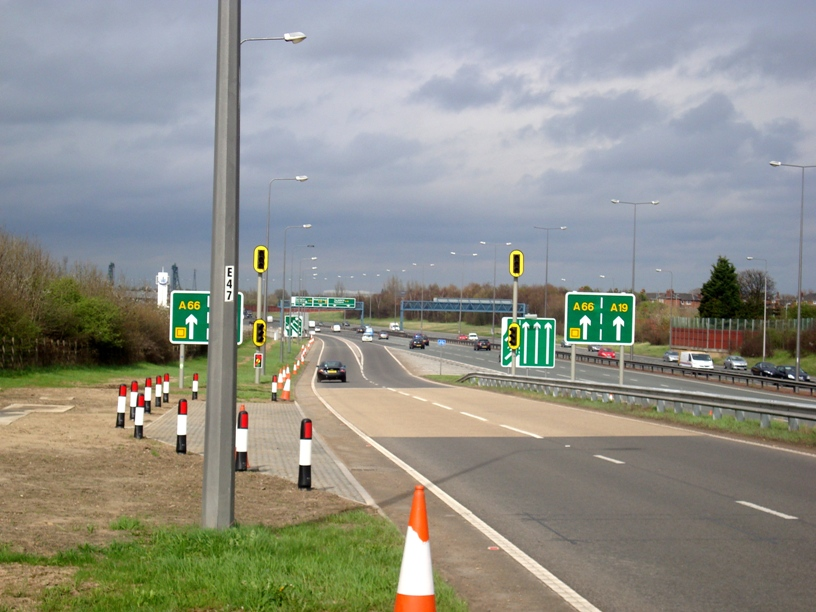
Ramp metering on the A19 in Middlesbrough

The first trial in the UK was on the M6 J10 near Walsall in 1986. No more sites were developed for the next two decades until a second 'pilot' study in 2006 by the Highways Agency (HA) concluded that ramp metering provides a net benefit under certain conditions - generally more congested junctions. A Summary Report by the HA, dated November 2007, includes an overview of the background and history, international experience, limitations, system operation, algorithms and implementation of ramp metering. In its conclusion it "envisaged ramp metering will be deployed more widely in the coming period." Ramp metering was then introduced widely in England - Phase 1 involved the implementation of approximately 30 sites and was completed by 2008. Phase 2 followed and as of March 2011 there are 88 Ramp Metering sites on the 4,500 miles (7,200 km) of strategic highways operated and maintained by the HA.

=== The Netherlands ===
The first ramp metering in the Netherlands was introduced in 1989. Ramp metering is being introduced more widely in the Netherlands after a pilot study by the AVV Transport Research Centre which concluded that ramp metering can provide a small benefit for the traffic flow on the highway, leading to a higher capacity. Ramp meters can also contribute to decreasing 'rat running'. By 2006 50 ramp meters were installed. This number increases by 4 to 5 each year.

=== Germany ===
Ramp metering has been implemented on Autobahns in several areas in Germany, including the Rhine-Ruhr area, Munich, and Hamburg.

=== Italy ===
Ramp metering has been implemented on Tangenziale di Venezia (A57) as temporary solution for the increased traffic before the definitive solution (building of the Passante di Mestre).

=== Ireland ===
There is one metered ramp in Ireland, located at J1 on the M1 Motorway (Ireland) Northbound. It is on the entry ramp from Coolock Lane, and is used when the M1 gets congested due to the M1 Port Tunnel and the M1 meeting further up.

=== Poland ===
The first two ramp meters in the country were installed in 2022 on two on-ramps on expressway S2 in Warsaw. These are the last on-ramps before the entrance of the Ursynów Tunnel both eastbound and westbound.

== Ramp metering elsewhere ==
=== Australia ===
The largest ramp metering network in the country is in Melbourne (managed and controlled through VicRoads) on the Eastern Freeway and most of all, on the entire inner-city M1 route which includes the Monash Freeway, the CityLink Tollway, the West Gate Freeway and the metropolitan section (south of the beginning of the Monash Freeway) for the Princes Freeway. There are also various ramp meters on the inner-city section of the Calder Freeway. Brisbane's Pacific Motorway and Bruce Highway (S/Bound Caboolture - Gateway Mwy) also uses ramp metering on some on-ramps, as does the northbound on-ramps of Perth's Kwinana Freeway between Roe and Canning Highways. On most motorways, ramp metering is activated when sensors indicate that traffic is heavy, however, some motorways without sensors use time-based activation.

The 2010 M1 Upgrade in Melbourne installed 62 ramp meters that are coordinated using the HERO suite of algorithms developed by Markos Papageorgiou and Associates from the Technical University of Crete. The system was built on the STREAMS platform and utilises the state-of-the-art ITS architecture. All the ramps can be linked when required to resolve motorway bottlenecks before they emerge. The results of a trial improved capacity by 9% over the previous fixed-time ramp-metering system, average speeds increased by 20 km/h (12 MPH) and traffic throughput at bottleneck locations can be reliably maintained around 2200 PCE per lane. The HERO system takes real time data every 20 seconds from the motorway, ramps and arterial road in order determine the best signal timing for the next 20 seconds. The data detection system comprises Sensys detectors in every freeway lane at 500 m (1,600 ft) spacings with a minimum detectors at three locations on each ramp including the freeway entrance with the arterial road. The system also manages the arterial road interface with the freeway, balances ramp queues and delays across ramps, and is capable of managing bottlenecks 3–4 km (1.9–2.5 mi) downstream of a ramp entrance. The system is also supplemented by real-time travel-time information to key destinations and incident and congestion information displayed on specially designed full-colour VMS on the approaches to the freeway entrance ramps. This information provides sufficient advice for motorists to determine whether or not to use the freeway during incidents etc. The system also provides dynamic ramp closure in the event of a major incident.

Ramp metering was introduced on the Rozelle Interchange in Sydney in 2024 to alleviate congestion for Victoria Rd users, after lengthy delays and back-ups through Drummoyne and Rozelle and onto the Anzac Bridge.

=== New Zealand ===
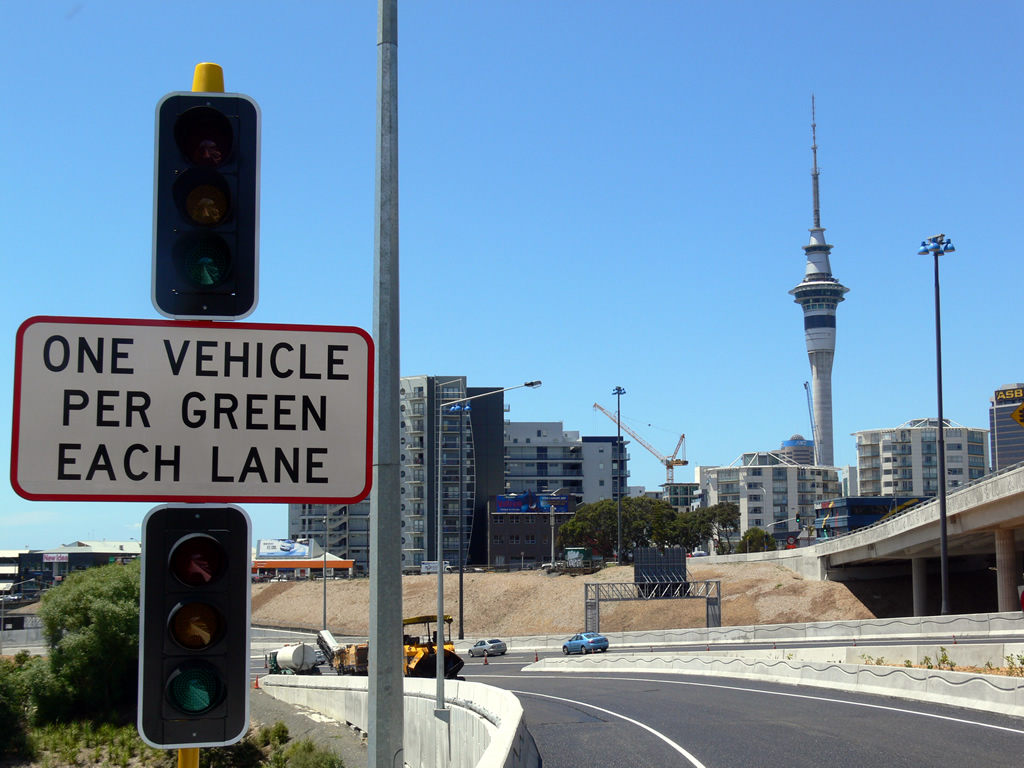
Ramp metering on North Western to Northern connection in Auckland

Auckland has currently 91 ramp meters across the Southern, South Western, Northern and North Western motorways making it the largest Southern Hemisphere ramp metering system. Ramp metering was installed Auckland-wide after a successful trial on Mahunga Drive in 2004, before the Mangere Bridge.

Traffic data collected from 25 ramp metering sites in 2007 (before ramp metering deployment) and 2009 (after) shows an average 25% improvement in both congestion duration and traffic speed as well as an 8% increase in traffic throughput. The data also shows an average reduction in crashes of 22%. This performance and safety data translates into estimated benefits of US$1.6M per ramp metering site per year.

The system controlling the ramps promotes the traditional coordination among on-ramps as well as real-time integration with traffic signals on the adjacent arterial network allowing the whole road network to be managed as a single integrated network. For example, when motorway incidents adversely impact the adjacent arterial roads, an automatic response to the arterial traffic signals can be triggered to mitigate the impacts of the incident and vice versa. Recurrent and excessive traffic queues at on-ramp and off-ramp can also be managed in an integrated way in real-time. This integrated management is possible in Auckland because the same adaptive SCATS system controls both arterial traffic lights and motorway ramp meters.

The term Ramp Signalling rather than Ramp Metering is purposefully adopted in New Zealand as a user-oriented name.

=== South Africa ===
Ramp meters were, for a while, installed on the Samrand South bound, Old Johannesburg South bound and on New Road North and South bound interchanges on the N1 Ben Schoeman highway. The ramp metering was part of the Intelligent Transport System launched in October 2007 to aid traffic flow between Johannesburg and Pretoria.

A ramp meter has also been installed on the northbound on-ramp from Blue Lagoon to the M4 Highway in Durban since early 2007.

=== Taiwan ===
Freeways in Taiwan use ramp meters during peak hours since 1993. Traffic enforcement cameras are deployed to deter running the red lights, but a bus lane at Taipei Interchange from northbound Chongqing North Road to southbound National Highway No. 1 in northern Datong District, Taipei allows buses and properly indicated emergency vehicles to bypass the traffic control imposed by the ramp meters.

=== Turkey ===
In 2016, two ramp meters were installed on a major highway in Istanbul. It has been noted that there is a 10% improvement in traffic provement along with 20% decrease in delays.

== Enforcement ==
On some ramp meters, there is a singular red light on the backside of the signal that is synchronized with the red light on the traffic signal that the drivers see when queueing. When the queueing drivers see the red light on the traffic signal, the backside red light is on, when the traffic signal displays green or yellow, the backside red light is off. This allows highway patrol to enforce the metering lights by having an officer park their car or motorcycle on the shoulder a short distance past the targeted signal, watch the red light for any offenders, and pull them over. Additionally, if the given ramp has a carpool bypass lane, officers from that vantage point may also catch and pull over non-carpoolers who are illegally using the carpool lane to skip past the ramp meter queue. On westbound I-80 in Oakland, California just past the Bay Bridge toll plaza, there is a section with overhead metering lights that cycle when the freeway traffic volumes are high, equipped with cameras that capture license plate images of drivers who run the red light and then send a fine.
