= Microsimulation =

Computerized analytical tool

Microsimulation is the use of computerized analytical tools to perform analysis of activities such as highway traffic flowing through an intersection, financial transactions, or pathogens spreading disease through a population on the granularity level of individuals. Synonyms include microanalytic simulation and microscopic simulation. Microsimulation, with its emphasis on stochastic or rule-based structures, should not be confused with the similar complementary technique of multi-agent simulation, which focuses more on the behaviour of individuals.

For example, a traffic microsimulation model could be used to evaluate the effectiveness of lengthening a turn lane at an intersection, and thus help decide whether it is worth spending money on actually lengthening the lane.

== Introduction ==
Microsimulation can be distinguished from other types of computer modeling in looking at the interaction of individual units such as people or vehicles. Each unit is treated as an autonomous entity and the interaction of the units is allowed vary depending on stochastic (randomized) parameters. These parameters are intended to represent individual preferences and tendencies. For example, in a traffic model some drivers are cautious and wait for a large gap before turning, while others are aggressive and accept small gaps. Similarly, in a public health model individuals could vary in their resistance to a virus, as well as in personal habits that contribute to the spread of the virus (e.g. how frequently/thoroughly they wash their hands).

The International Microsimulation Association, defines microsimulation as a modelling technique that operates at the level of individual units such as persons, households, vehicles or firms. Within the model each unit is represented by a record containing a unique identifier and a set of associated attributes – e.g. a list of persons with known age, sex, marital and employment status; or a list of vehicles with known origins, destinations and operational characteristics. A set of rules (transition probabilities) are then applied to these units leading to simulated changes in state and behaviour. These rules may be deterministic (probability = 1), such as changes in tax liability resulting from changes in tax regulations, or stochastic (probability <=1), such as chance of dying, marrying, giving birth or moving within a given time period. In either case the result is an estimate of the outcomes of applying these rules, possibly over many time steps, including both total overall aggregate change and (importantly) the way this change is distributed in the population or location that is being modeled.

== Econometric microsimulation ==
In applied econometrics research, microsimulation is used to simulate the behavior of individuals over time. The microsimulation can either be dynamic or static. If it is dynamic the behavior of people changes over time, whereas in the static case a constant behavior is assumed.

There are several microsimulation models for taxation, pensions, and other types of economic and financial activity. These models are typically implemented by government agencies or academics. One example is Pensim2 (a dynamic microsimulation pension model) which dynamically simulates pension income for the next 50 years in the United Kingdom. EUROMOD is a static microsimulation model for 27 European Union states, while SOUTHMOD adopts the same framework for several countries in the Global South. North American microsimulation models include the longitudinal, dynamic microsimulation CORSIM, and daughter models DYNACAN (Canada, terminated June 1, 2009) and POLISIM (United States). The U.S. Department of Health and Human Services uses the static microsimulation Transfer Income Model (TRIM) to understand the potential impacts of changes to tax, transfer, and health programs. A related example that provides spatially detailed microsimulation of urban development is PECAS.

Econometric microsimulation models can be classified into two types:

- Closed, longitudinal, dynamic microsimulation models (such as DYNACAN and Pensim2) begin with an initial population that is only modified by the simulated life events of the demographics modules, such as fertility, mortality and migration. Thus, at any time during the model run, the simulated population can be expected to remain a fully representative (synthetic) sample of the population that it is modeling.
- Open models tend to focus on specific key individuals and generate their representativeness based on the population of said individuals. In such an environment, new individuals are added or removed from the population as needed in order to ensure an "appropriate" set of life events for the key individuals.

One of the clearest examples of this distinction is the treatment of marriage within the two types of models. While open models can simply generate an appropriate spouse for the key individual, closed models must, instead, determine which people within its population are likely to marry, and then to match them.

== Traffic microsimulation ==
view of a typical microsimulation 2D animation. Shown, a roundabout in a country where traffic drives on the left.

Microsimulation is also used in traffic modelling and is typified by software packages such as TransModeler, PTV VISSIM, TSIS-CORSIM, INTEGRATION, Cube Dynasim, LISA+, Quadstone Paramics, SiAS Paramics, Simtraffic, Aimsun, and MATSim. Analytical modelling software such as LINSIG, TRANSYT, TRANSYT-7F or SIDRA INTERSECTION represent a different class of models based on mathematical algorithms representing combinations of traffic model elements.

Traffic microsimulation models simulate the behaviour of individual vehicles within a predefined road network and are used to predict the likely impact of changes in traffic patterns resulting from changes to traffic flow or from changes to the physical environment.

Microsimulation has its greatest strength in modelling congested road networks due to its ability to simulate queueing conditions. Microsimulation models will continue to provide results at high degrees of saturation, up to the point of absolute gridlock. This capability makes these types of models very useful to analyse traffic operations in urban areas and city centers, including interchanges, roundabouts, unsignalized and signalized intersections, signal coordinated corridors, and area networks. Microsimulation also reflects even relatively small changes in the physical environment such as the narrowing of lanes or the relocation of junction stop lines.

In recent years, microsimulation modelling has gained attention in its ability to visually represent predicted traffic behaviour through 3D animation, enabling laypeople such as politicians and the general public to fully appreciate the impacts of a proposed scheme. Further advances are being made in this area with the merging of microsimulation model data with cinematic quality 3D animation and with virtual reality by such companies as FORUM8 in Japan.

== Pedestrian or crowd microsimulation ==
Pedestrian or agent based microsimulation has grown in use and acceptance within industry in recent years; these systems focus on the simulation of individual people moving through an area of space with respect to analytics measures such as Space Utilisation, Level of Service, Density, Packing and Frustration.

Many current traffic microsimulation software packages are combining traffic components and pedestrians to create a more complete systems while many transitional crowd simulation tools continue to be refined for use in large scale urban space design.

== Microsimulation in health sciences ==
In health sciences microsimulation generates individual life histories. The technique is used when "stock-and-flow" type modeling of proportions (macrosimulation) of the population cannot sufficiently describe the system of interest. This type of modeling does not necessarily involve interaction between individuals (as described above) and in that case can generate individuals independently of each other, and can easily work with continuous time instead of discrete time steps.

Several examples of microsimulation models in health sciences have been brought together in the U.S. National Cancer Institute's CISNET program (http://cisnet.cancer.gov/). In Canada, the Population Health Model (POHEM) is a common platform that examines multiple chronic diseases, including diabetes, cardiovascular disease and arthritis.

== Spatial microsimulation ==
Economic and health approaches to microsimulation provide insight into the impacts of changes in environmental, economic, or policy conditions on a given population of individuals. However, the impacts of many changes are context dependent, meaning that the same alteration (e.g. in income tax bands) may have desirable effects in some regions, but undesirable effects in others. This understanding lies at the root of spatial approaches to microsimulation. The term spatial microsimulation refers to a set of techniques that allow the characteristics of individuals living in a particular area to be approximated, based on a set of constraint variables that are known about the area. As with econometric microsimulation, spatial microsimulation can be either dynamic or static, and can include interacting or passive units.

Guy Orcutt is widely cited as the originator of spatial microsimulation. Spatial microsimulation has high computational and data requirements and some degree of computer programming is a prerequisite to setting up models. For these reasons, the technique is not widely used. However, a number of factors have led to rapid growth in the number of publications on spatial microsimulation within academic geography and related disciplines. These include:

- The availability and low costs of powerful personal computers.
- The emergence of user friendly and low-cost computer software with which microsimulation models can be created. Examples are R, Java, and Python, each of which can be classified as Free and open source software.
- Improving data collection activities by governments, corporations, and non-profit organisations.
- Improving data accessibility.

== Programming languages and platforms ==
There are general purpose programming languages, in addition to topic-specific programs (see Traffic Simulation). Examples include JAS-mine, LIAM2, MODGEN, and OpenM++.

== See also ==
- Traffic flow
- Dynamic microsimulation pension model
