= Public Transport Information and Priority System =

The Public Transport Information and Priority System, abbreviated PTIPS, is a computer-based system used in New South Wales, Australia, that brings together information about public transport entities, such as buses. Where applicable, PTIPS can also provide transport vehicles with priority at traffic signals.

PTIPS consists of a number of hardware and software components installed on-board buses which wirelessly communicate with a central set of servers. PTIPS also relies on an interface with Sydney Coordinated Adaptive Traffic System (SCATS) - to provide the priority feature) and bus/route/timetable data provided by bus organisations and government authorities.

PTIPS provides:

- Real-time tracking of bus location and status
- Traffic light priority for late running buses
- Bus/Timetable performance and reliability reports
- Real-time Bus arrival information for bus stops

== How PTIPS works ==
PTIPS works by combining, on the one hand, schedule and route path information for buses performing timetabled services (as opposed to, say, charter trips), and on the other hand, live location data transmitted by the buses to PTIPS.

PTIPS receives XML data files from the bus operators, which contain information relating to planned trips (for example, route paths, trips & schedules, bus stops etc.)

Each bus that PTIPS tracks is equipped with a hardware device that records its location via GPS, and transmits it to the central PTIPS servers via the cellular radio communications network. Buses transmit these messages at certain intervals (which are configurable, and which vary depending on what the bus is doing), and also when they pass certain points along their intended route. Apart from GPS location, the transmitted messages also include information about the vehicle and which trip it is doing.

With the above information, PTIPS can compare the location of a bus performing a certain trip, at a certain point in time, with where it should be, based on the planned route and timetable data.

== Real time apps ==
Transport for NSW worked with several developers in late 2012 to create, and release smartphone applications with access to the real-time bus data provided from PTIPS. Released in December, several iOS and Android apps went live on their respective App stores, allowing customers to track where their buses were in real-time, as well as any delays or timetable changes as they occur. It was initially trialled on Sydney Buses' route 400.

In 2013, this real-time data was further expanded to provide live information from Sydney Trains, and private bus operators Hillsbus and Busways Blacktown, and was eventually rolled out across bus operators in Greater Sydney.

In 2020, Transport for NSW started working with bus operators to introduce real-time tracking to regional bus services. As of March 2022, PTIPS-assisted real-time tracking was available for the regional centres of Albury, Armidale, Bathurst, Bega, Coffs Harbour, Dubbo, Forbes, Grafton, Nowra, Parkes, Port Macquarie, Queanbeyan, Tamworth, Tweed Heads and Wagga Wagga.
