= PTV Vissim =

Traffic flow simulation software

- VISSIM 11 interface
- Developer: PTV Planung Transport Verkehr AG
- Stable release: 2025.00-08 / 26 July 2025
- Operating system: Microsoft Windows
- Type: Traffic flow simulation
- License: Software license agreement
- Website: Official website

PTV Vissim is a microscopic multi-modal traffic flow simulation software package developed by PTV Planung Transport Verkehr AG in Karlsruhe, Germany. It was first developed in 1992. The name is derived from "Verkehr In Städten - SIMulationsmodell" (German for "Traffic in cities - simulation model").

== Scope of application ==
The scope of application ranges from various issues of traffic engineering (transport engineering, transportation planning, signal timing), public transport, urban planning over fire protection (evacuation simulation) to 3d visualization (computer animation, architectural animation) for illustrative purpose and communication to the general public.

PTV Vissim is part of the PTV Vision Traffic Suite which also includes PTV Visum (traffic analysis and forecasting) and PTV Vistro (signal optimisation and traffic impact).

== Modeling ==
=== Microscopic simulation ===
The basic traffic model ruling the movement of vehicles was developed by Rainer Wiedemann in 1974 at Karlsruhe University. It is a car-following model that considers physical and psychological aspects of the drivers.

The model underlying pedestrian dynamics is the Social Force Model by Dirk Helbing et al. from 1995.

"Microscopic simulation", sometimes called microsimulation, means each entity (car, train, person) of reality is simulated individually, i.e. it is represented by a corresponding entity in the simulation, thereby considering all relevant properties. The same holds for the interactions between the entities. The opposite would be a "macroscopic simulation", in which the description of reality is shifted from individuals to "averaged" variables like flow and density. The corresponding product from the same manufacturer is called Visum.

=== Transport modes ===
In Vissim, the following types of traffic can be simulated and mutually interact:

- Vehicles (cars, buses, and trucks)
- Public transport (trams, buses)
- Cycles (bicycles, motorcycles)
- Pedestrians
- Rickshaws

=== Vehicle interactions ===
In VISSIM, all vehicles run along links, which represent traffic moving in one direction only along a road. Links are joined together with Connectors.

Vehicle conflict points such as yielding or merging at junctions must be modeled explicitly using Priority Rules, Conflict Areas or Signal Heads.

Signals can be modeled with fixed-time plans, or various modules such as VAP (Vehicle Actuated Programming) are available to model on-demand signals and other types of control and coordination.
