= Pitu Mirchandani =

American scientist and engineer

- Citizenship: American
- Education: University of California, Los Angeles, Massachusetts Institute of Technology
- Scientific career
- Institutions: Arizona State University, University of Arizona, Rensselaer Polytechnic Institute

Pitu B. Mirchandani is an American scientist, engineer and researcher whose work focuses on use-inspired model building for decision-making and planning.

He holds the Avnet Chair for Supply Chain Networks at Arizona State University (ASU), where he serves as professor emeritus in the School of Computing and Augmented Intelligence and was the Chief Scientist at the U.S. Department of Homeland Security’s Center for Accelerating Operational Efficiency (CAOE).

He was inducted as a Life Fellow of the IEEE in 2016 and as a Fellow of INFORMS in 2015.

== Education and career ==
Mirchandani received his Bachelor of Science degree in engineering with highest honors from the University of California, Los Angeles (UCLA) in 1966, followed by a Master of Science in engineering (Control Systems) from UCLA in 1967. He then pursued graduate studies at the Massachusetts Institute of Technology (MIT), earning an S.M. in Aeronautics and Astronautics with a focus on Man-Machine Systems in 1971 and a Sc.D. in Operations Research in 1975.

=== Academic career ===
Mirchandani began his academic career at Rensselaer Polytechnic Institute (RPI), where he served from 1975 to 1990 in the Departments of Electrical, Computer & Systems Engineering and Decision Sciences & Engineering Systems. He chaired the university's Operations Research and Statistics Program between 1984 and 1987 and held the position of associate professor before his promotion to full professor. In 1990, he joined the University of Arizona as professor of systems and industrial engineering, electrical and computer engineering, and applied mathematics. He served as head of the Department of Systems and Industrial Engineering from 1990 to 1998 and later directed the ATLAS Research Center (Advanced Traffic and Logistics Algorithms and Systems) from 1998 to 2009.

In 2009, Mirchandani moved to Arizona State University, where he continues to teach and conduct research. At ASU, he has held positions, including AVNET chair for supply chain networks (since 2014) and chief scientist of the DHS Center for Accelerating Operational Efficiency (since 2017).

== Research ==
His early work contributed to the theory of network location and optimization, leading to the publication of Location on Networks: Theory and Algorithms and the edited volume Discrete Location Theory.

He later extended his focus to real-time and stochastic systems, developing decision-making models that incorporate uncertainty and adapt dynamically to new information. One of his works is the RHODES system (Real-Time Hierarchical Optimized Distributed Effective System), a traffic signal control system that integrates real-time data analytics to optimize urban traffic flow.

His research has addressed the deployment of electric-vehicle (EV) charging infrastructure, the management of autonomous vehicle fleets, and the integration of mobility and energy networks.

Mirchandani's recent work includes real-time optimization for evacuation routing, sensor placement on traffic networks, and proactive disaster-response strategies. A 2022 study co-authored by Mirchandani on drone logistics for uncertain demand in disaster-impacted populations.
