= Sidra Intersection =

Software package

- Developers: Akcelik and Associates Pty Ltd (trading as Sidra Solutions)
- Release: 1984; 42 years ago
- Stable release: 11.0.2.66 / 31 March 2026; 5 months ago
- Operating system: Windows
- Type: Micro-analytical traffic evaluation tool for intersection, interchange and network design, traffic assignment, operations, planning and signal timings.
- License: Proprietary
- Website: sidraintersection.com

Sidra Intersection (styled SIDRA, previously called Sidra and aaSidra) is a software package used for intersection (junction), interchange and network capacity, level of service, performance and traffic impact analysis, and signalised intersection, interchange and network timing calculations by traffic design, operations and planning professionals.

== History ==
First released in 1984, it has been under continuous development in response to user feedback. Version 6.0 released in April 2013 added network modelling capability and new vehicle movement classes. Version 7.0 released in April 2016 included new timing analysis methods for Common Control Groups (multiple intersections operating under one signal controller) and Network Cycle Time and Signal Offset calculations for signal coordination.

Version 9.0 released in May 2020 included improved network model processing efficiency and workflow efficiency through substantial user interface enhancements and model improvements.

Version 9.1 introduced important traffic model enhancements and extensive user interface and model output improvements including network layout and roundabout layout enhancements, and customised reports and displays. The model enhancements include output by Movement Class, a new Variable Demand model, upstream delay and stop rate model for approach short lanes, the HCM Edition 6/7 Extended Roundabout Capacity Model and a combined pedestrian actuation and minor phase actuation method for signal timing calculations.

Version 10 introduced significant updates and enhancements, including a new future-proof, versionless project file format (.sipx) designed for compatibility, reduced file sizes, and faster processing. It also features efficient volume data management through the new Volume Store, eliminating duplication of Sites and Networks for more streamlined Scenario Analysis. SIDRA MAPS integrates OpenStreetMap (OSM) data for advanced visualisation and site creation directly from map data. The software expands modelling capabilities with new Site Types—Turbo Roundabouts, Arterial Segments, Freeway Segments, and Freeway Segments with Ramps—and enhances signal timing analysis with real-number timings, multiple green periods, and improved performance models. Additional model enhancements include refined queue modelling and a new Exit Merge Queue Model. User interface improvements provide a redesigned ribbon, drag-and-drop functionality, and advanced search and import tools for easier navigation. Additionally, the updated VOLUMES Excel Utility allows seamless integration and processing of volume-related data directly within Excel.

SIDRA INTERSECTION 11 was released in March 2026. It introduced major new features and various improvements. These include SIDRA ASSIGN (new traffic assignment module), use of Origin-Destination (O-D) Matrix Data for ASSIGN, SIDRA Glossary update including traffic assignment terms, enhanced Network Convergence method including a new Two-Loop Convergence process, improved User Interface for User Report Template dialogs, website changes including the implementation of new DOCS formatting, various model parameter updates, improvements to platoon modelling and proportion queued for oversaturated cases for multiple green periods, and user interface improvements. New Software Licensing including Personal and Team Subscription Licence products has been introduced.

Sidra Intersection is a micro-analytical traffic evaluation tool that employs lane-by-lane and vehicle drive cycle models. It can be used to compare alternative treatments of individual intersections and networks of intersections involving signalised intersections (fixed-time/pretimed and actuated), roundabouts (not signalised), roundabouts with metering signals, fully signalised roundabouts, two-way stop and give-way (yield) sign control, all-way (4-way and 3-way) stop sign control, merging, single-point urban interchanges, traditional diamond and diverging diamond interchanges, basic freeway segments, signalised and unsignalised (zebra) midblock crossings for pedestrians, merging analysis and network modelling of these intersection and interchange types. Sidra Intersection allows modelling of separate Movement Classes (Light Vehicles, Heavy Vehicles, Buses, Bicycles, Large Trucks, Light Rail/Trams and six User Classes) with different vehicle characteristics. These movements can be allocated to different lanes, lane segments and signal phases; for example for modelling bus priority lanes and signals. In Australia and New Zealand, Sidra Intersection is endorsed by Austroads. In the US, Sidra Intersection is recognised by the US Highway Capacity Manual, TRB/FHWA 2010 Roundabout Guide (NCHRP Report 672) and various roundabout guides.

As of April 2019, Sidra had about 1,900 organisations with 8,000 licences in 85 countries.

== Lane-based intersection and network analysis method ==
The lane-by-lane capacity and performance analysis method used by Sidra Intersection includes identifying any de facto exclusive lanes, unequal lane utilisation, lane change, modelling of short lanes (turn bays, lanes with parking upstream, and loss of a lane at the exit side) including delays and stops experienced by drivers in the queue upstream of short lane entry, and lane blockage in shared lanes including lanes containing opposed (permitted) turns, slip (bypass) lane movements and turns on red. Intersections and networks can be modelled in detail using this method and signal timings can be determined accordingly with advantages over approach-based and lane group-based methods.

== Network model ==
SIDRA NETWORK model provides a lane-based congestion modelling tool. It determines the backward spread of congestion as queues on downstream lanes block upstream lanes, and applies capacity constraint to oversaturated upstream lanes; thus limiting the flows entering downstream lanes. These two elements are highly interactive with opposite effects. A network-wide iterative process is used to find a solution that balances these opposite effects. The lane-based network model provides information about departure and arrival patterns, queue lengths, lane blockage probabilities, backward spread of queues, and so on at a lane level. The model allows for the effect of upstream lane use patterns on downstream signal platoon patterns, in turn affecting the estimates of network performance measures (travel time, delay, back of queue, stop rate). This is important especially in evaluating closely-spaced (paired) intersections and interchanges with high demand flows where vehicles have limited opportunities for lane changing between intersections. Such facilities include staggered T intersections, freeway signalised diamond interchanges, freeway roundabout interchanges, fully signalised roundabouts (including signalised circulating roads), large signalised intersections with wide median storage areas, staged crossings at sign-controlled intersections, intersections with nearby pedestrian crossings, and alternative intersection and interchange configurations such as diverging diamond interchanges (signalised), continuous flow intersections, restricted cross-street U-turns, and so on. The software package offers Network Templates for ease of setting up models of these facilities. The modelling of arrival patterns at downstream approach lanes takes into account implied midblock lane changes. Different movement classes (light and heavy vehicles, buses, large trucks, bicycles, and so on) are treated individually in modelling platoon arrival and departure patterns.

== Performance measures ==
Sidra Intersection provides a large number of intersection and network performance measures and a number of alternative Level of Service (LOS) methods and LOS Target settings to determine acceptable intersection and network design. Standard performance measures such as delay, queue length and number of stops as well as measures to help with environmental impacts and economic analysis are provided. Performance and Level of Service results are given at various aggregation levels (individual lanes, individual movements, approaches, intersections, routes and networks) and separately for vehicle Movement Classes, pedestrians, and persons (results for pedestrians and people in vehicles combined). Extensive graphical displays present signal timing and performance output. The Interactive Offsets facility helps the user to investigate the effect of two-way platoon progression on network performance.

== Roundabouts ==
Sidra Intersection allows analysis of single-lane and multi-lane roundabouts. It employs a combined (hybrid) geometry and gap-acceptance modelling approach in order to take into account the effect of roundabout geometry on driver behaviour directly through gap-acceptance modelling. It offers SIDRA Standard, SIDRA Standard (HCM) version under the US HCM software setups, US HCM 6, US HCM 6 Extended and US HCM 2010 roundabout capacity models. As the roundabout capacity model in HCM Edition 7 is the same as the model in HCM Edition 6 where it was first introduced, the "HCM 6" roundabout capacity model continues to apply. The HCM 6 Extended model was developed for SIDRA INTERSECTION based on the results of roundabout surveys carried out for Wisconsin DOT in the USA. The model provides the ability to specify more detailed parameter values that distinguish different lane configurations. Sidra Intersection software includes templates for roundabouts including all roundabout examples given in MUTCD 2009 and TRB/FHWA 2010 Roundabout Informational Guide (NCHRP Report 672). A Roundabout Metering analysis method allows the evaluation of the effect of metering signals on roundabout capacity and performance. Metering signals help to solve the problem of excessive queuing and delays at approaches affected by unbalanced traffic streams at roundabouts. Fully signalised roundabouts can be modelled as a network. A recent NCHRP survey of US state transport agencies found that Sidra Intersection is the most widely used software tool in the US for roundabout analysis as reported in the US Transportation Research Board document titled Roundabout Practice.

== Signal timing methods ==
Sidra Intersection includes fixed-time / pretimed (EQUISAT) and actuated signal timing analysis methods for intersections with any geometry allowing for simple as well as complex phasing arrangements. In addition to the traditional methods for signalised intersection cycle time (practical, optimum and user-given) and green split methods, it includes advanced signal timing methods such as a unique critical movement analysis method, multi-sequence signal analysis, variable phasing analysis, green split priority for coordinated or user-specified movements, signal timings that account for pedestrian actuation and minor phase actuation requirements, and allows the use of two green periods for modeling slip / bypass lanes, permitted-protected turns, and turn on red. Network signal timing methods are available to determine cycle time (practical, optimum and user-given), green times and signal offsets for coordination of signalised intersections controlled by separate signal controllers as well as Common Control Group timings for intersections running under a single signal controller. The lane-based network model includes detailed movements of vehicle platoons with lane changes between signalised intersections for assessing the efficiency of signal coordination and optimising signal timings for signalised intersection networks.

== Model calibration ==
Sidra Intersection provides facilities to calibrate its traffic models for local conditions. It provides software setups with appropriate default systems for different countries, allows the users to prepare customised software setups, provides a sensitivity analysis facility to allow testing of the effect of variations in values of various key parameters, and describes various calibration techniques (including survey methods) in the User Guide. In particular, the US HCM (Customary and Metric) software setups of SIDRA INTERSECTION are calibrated using model parameters based on the US Highway Capacity Manual (see the section titled "Highway Capacity Manual"). Among many model parameters, the saturation flow parameter for signalized intersections and the critical gap and follow-up headway parameters for roundabouts that are not signalised and sign-controlled intersections are identified as key parameters for calibration to match real-life traffic conditions. At the same time, the queue space (jam spacing) parameter used in back of queue modelling is identified as a key parameter in general due to its role in approach short lane modelling for intersections and lane blockage (queue spillback) modelling for networks.

== Emissions and energy ==
Sidra Intersection estimates the cost, energy and air pollution implications of intersection design using a four-mode elemental model with detailed acceleration, deceleration, idling and cruise elements. This drive-cycle (modal analysis) method coupled with a power-based vehicle model is used to estimate operating cost, fuel consumption, greenhouse gas (CO_{2}) and pollutant (CO, NO_{x}, HC) emissions in order to assess the environmental impacts of traffic congestion. The model includes estimates of acceleration and deceleration times and distances for light and heavy vehicles coupled with a polynomial model of acceleration-time profile. The vehicle parameters in the model have been updated recently for modern vehicle fleet.

== Highway capacity manual ==
Sidra Intersection software complements Highway Capacity Manual (HCM Edition 7) as an advanced intersection analysis tool which offers various extensions on the capabilities of the HCM. The Highway Capacity Manual version of Sidra Intersection has options for US Customary and Metric units. The roundabout capacity model for single-lane and multi-lane roundabouts based on research on US roundabouts as described in HCM Edition 7, Chapter 22 is integrated into the software. The US HCM 6 roundabout capacity model, which was introduced in HCM Edition 6 and which remains unchanged in HCM Edition 7, is a lane-based model which is suitable for the extensions implemented in Sidra Intersection.

== Scientific foundation and awards ==
Sidra Intersection was first developed over 20 years at the Australian Road Research Board (1979–1999) as a technology transfer tool to enable practitioners to use major research results without delay, and then at Akcelik and Associates since 2000. Akcelik and Associates conducts its own research s well as using the latest research results which become available internationally including the Highway Capacity Manual. Thus Sidra Intersection includes high technical content based on extensive scientific research. A formal "effectiveness audit" of related research carried out by an independent panel formed by the Australian Road Research Board in 1993 noted "the panel rated the technical merit of the research as very high and concluded that it has established international and professional reputations in the fields of traffic signal analysis, roundabout analysis, and energy and emissions modelling". The company has won awards including the 2010 Telstra Business Awards – AMP Innovation Award and the 2009 the Governor of Victoria Export Awards – Winner Small Business Award. The awards received by the founder of the company, Dr Rahmi Akcelik, includes the prestigious 1999 Clunies Ross National Science and Technology award for outstanding contribution to the application of science and technology in Australia, and the Institute of Transportation Engineers (USA) 1986 Transportation Energy Conservation Award in Memory of Frederick A. Wagner for research into energy savings from urban traffic management (received as part of the energy research team at the Australian Road Research Board).
