= Brisbane Linked Intersection Signal System =

Brisbane Linked Intersection Signal System or BLISS was Brisbane City Council's ITS infrastructure platform. This system incorporates large-scale Traffic Signal control, a Real Time Passenger Information System (RAPID), and other infrastructure for managing and monitoring the road network for the Greater Brisbane Area.

For many years, Brisbane City Council was very progressive amongst local governments in the development and implementation of intelligent transport systems (ITS) solutions, and BLISS is one of the results of these endeavours.

== History ==
The BLISS project began in the mid-1980s to replace separate legacy systems for traffic signal coordination within the city, and pioneered the use of local co-ordination modules integrated with, or connected to the traffic signal controller in the field.

BLISS was previously used in Brisbane to control approximately 900 sets of traffic signals throughout the city. It was replaced by SCATS.

BLISS was also used for a number of years along Jalan Tebrau in Johor Bahru, Malaysia. It is no longer used, developed or supported.

== Alternative Software ==
- Transmax
- SCATS - Sydney Coordinated Adaptive Traffic System
