= Induction loop =

Type of detection system

An induction or inductive loop is an electromagnetic communication or detection system which uses a moving magnet or an alternating current to induce an electric current in a nearby wire. Induction loops are used for transmission and reception of communication signals, or for detection of metal objects in metal detectors or vehicle presence indicators. A common modern use for induction loops is to provide hearing assistance to hearing-aid users.

== Applications ==
=== Vehicle detection ===
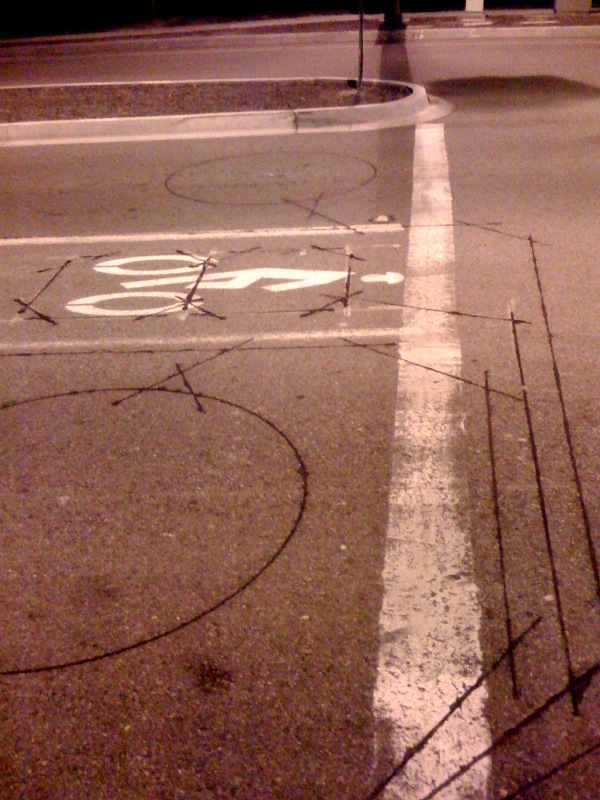
An example of the inductance loop installed in the road for cars and bikes

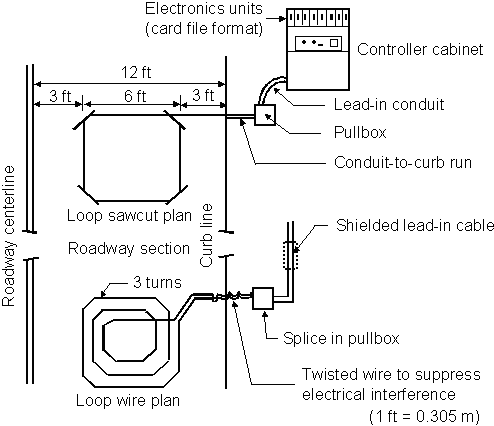
Schematic of such a detector

Vehicle detection loops, called inductive-loop traffic detectors, can detect vehicles passing or arriving at a certain point, for instance approaching a traffic light or in motorway traffic. An insulated, electrically conducting loop is installed in the pavement. The electronics unit applies alternating current electrical energy onto the wire loops at frequencies between 10 kHz to 200 kHz, depending on the model. The inductive-loop system behaves as a tuned electrical circuit in which the loop wire and lead-in cable are the inductive elements. When a vehicle passes over the loop or is stopped within the loop, some of the vehicle's ferrous body material increases the loop's inductance, in the same principle as including a metal core within a solenoid coil. However, the peripheral metal of the vehicle has an opposite effect on the inductance due to eddy currents that are produced. The decrease in inductance from the eddy currents more than offsets the increase from the ferrous mass of the engine, and the net effect is an overall reduction in the inductance of the wire loop. The decrease in inductance tends to decrease the electrical impedance of the wire to alternating current. The decrease in impedance actuates the electronics unit output relay or solid-state optically isolated output, which sends a pulse to the traffic signal controller signifying the passage or presence of a vehicle.

Parking structures for automobiles may use inductive loops to track traffic (occupancy) in and out or may be used by access gates or ticketing systems to detect vehicles while others use parking guidance and information systems. Railways may use an induction loop to detect the passage of trains past a given point, as an electronic treadle.

The relatively crude nature of the loop means that small metal masses cannot trigger the relay. This is good in that the loop does not thus produce very many "false positive" triggers (say, for example, by a pedestrian crossing the loop with a pocket full of loose metal change). However, it sometimes also means that bicycles, scooters, and motorcycles stopped at such intersections may be undetected (and therefore risk being ignored by the switch/signal). Most loops can be adjusted manually to consistently detect the presence of scooters and motorcycles. Several U.S. states have enacted "dead red" laws which permit such vehicles to proceed through a red signal after a given time if the loop does not detect them.

=== Bicycle detection ===
Induction loops are also used to count active mobility commuters. They can count bicycles or e-scooters using the same detection. The major difference is the signal which has a different shape. To be counted the active transportation device needs to include metal in the wheels. Indeed metal gives the signal its shape.

Cities with bicycle policies such as Paris, Montréal or New York use such devices to follow active transportation trends. Counting cyclists & e-scooters gives insights on how users commute on your territory.

=== Vehicle classification ===
Inductance loops have also been used to classify types of vehicles. Sampling the loop at a high frequency results in a unique signature for each vehicle allowing for classification of the body type.

=== Metal detector ===
A different sort of "induction loop" is applied to metal detectors, where a large coil, which forms part of a resonant circuit, is effectively "detuned" by the coil's proximity to a conductive object. The detected object may be metallic (metal and cable detection) or conductive/capacitive (stud/cavity detection). Other configurations of this equipment use two or more receiving coils, and the detected object modifies the inductive coupling or alters the phase angle of the voltage induced in the receiving coils relative to the oscillator coil.

An anti-submarine indicator loop was a device used to detect submarines and surface vessels using specially designed submerged cables connected to a galvanometer.

=== Audio ===
An audio induction loop, also known as a hearing loop, provides assistance to hearing aid users. The system has one or more loops in the area in which a hearing aid user would be present. Such an induction loop receiver is classically a very small iron-cored inductor (telecoil). The system commonly uses an analog power amplifier matched to the low impedance of the transmission loop. The transmission is normally direct rather than superimposed or modulated upon a carrier, though multi-channel systems have been implemented using modulation. Many hearing aids contain a telecoil which allows the user to receive and hear the magnetic field and remove the normal audio signal provided from the hearing aid microphone site.

Since there is no "tuning" available, as the telecoil directly picks up all audio-frequency magnetic fields, careful system design is required where more than one induction loop is used in a building; for example, adjacent movie theatres or lecture halls. Telecoils may also pick up noise from non-audio sources such as power lines, lamps, or CRT monitors.

== See also ==
- Induction coil
- Inductive sensor
- Sydney Coordinated Adaptive Traffic System
