= Signal timing =

Signal timing is the technique which traffic engineers use to distribute right-of-way at a signalized intersection. The process includes selecting appropriate timing values, which are implemented in specialized traffic signal controllers. Signal timing involves deciding how much green time the traffic signal provides an intersection by movement or approach (depending on the lane configuration), how long the pedestrian WALK signal should be, whether trains or buses should be prioritized, and numerous other factors.

== Basic signal timing operation ==
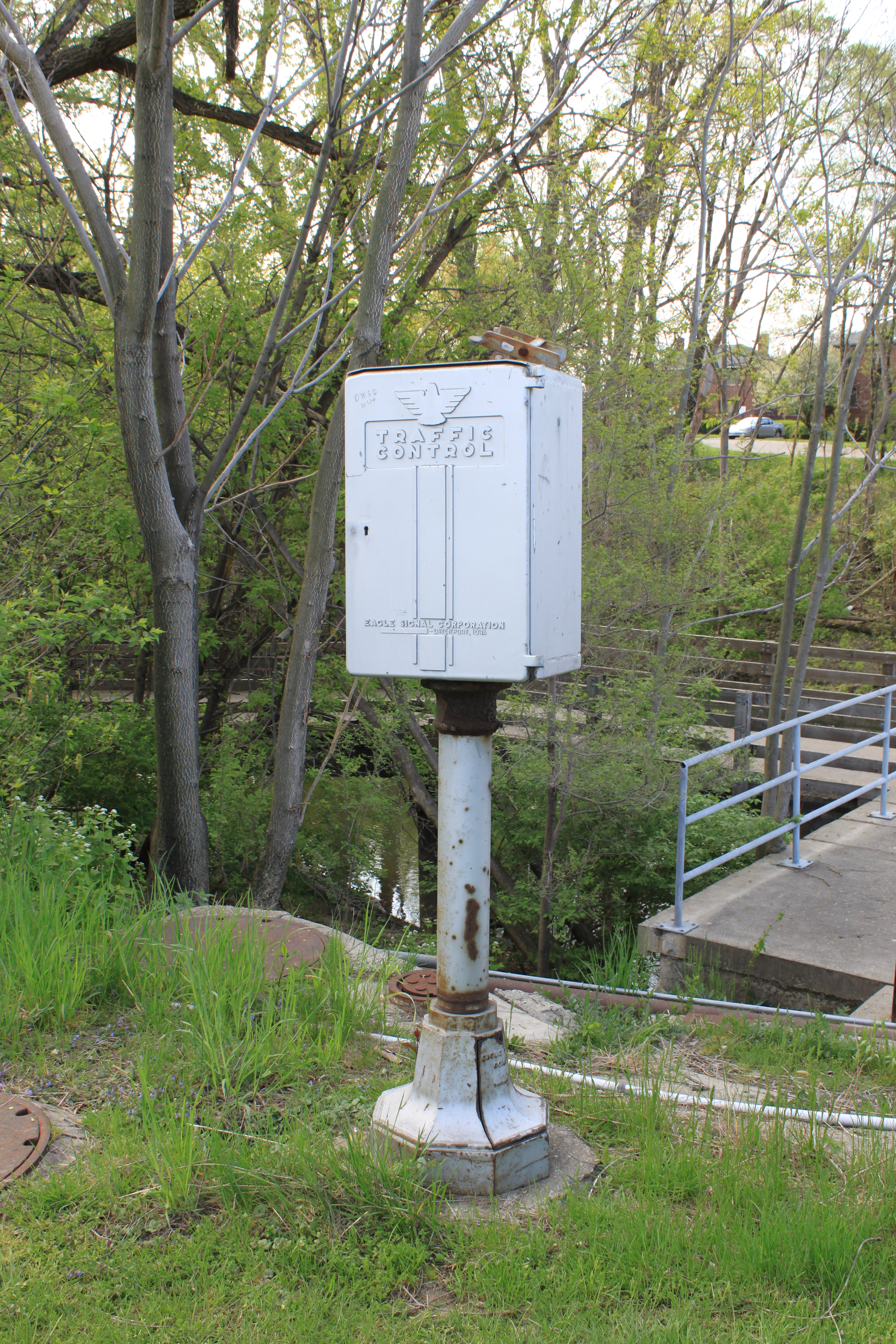
Traffic signal control box, Dearborn, Michigan

In signal timing fundamentals, there are different modes of operation that the signal controller can use to control the signal. Traffic signals may be grouped into two broad categories by their method of operation. They can either be pre-timed or actuated. Pre-timed signals provide each intersection approach a fixed amount of time on a predetermined basis, serving each approach consecutively, and repeating the pattern. In normal operation, no movements are skipped. An actuated traffic signal relies on a mechanism to detect vehicles as they approach the intersection. Where detection has occurred, green time is provided to that approach. Approaches with no detection are skipped. These two schemes are also referred to as interval-based and phase-based signal timing.

The National Electrical Manufacturers Association (NEMA) has defined a standard scheme by which each intersection movement may be serviced without allowing conflicting movements to enter the intersection simultaneously. This scheme is commonly referred to as the NEMA Phasing Diagram.

One of the most commonly used methods of detection is the use of induction loops. Other methods include magnetometers, video, infrared, radar, and microwave detection. A typical loop detector installation can be up to six feet square or six feet wide by thirty feet long. Other shapes may also be used, including circular and hexagonal loops. These are cut into or buried below the surface of the roadway. The preferred wire is stranded copper with an insulating cover, loosely surrounded by a protective jacket. Electrically, this is a 'flat' coil embedded in the pavement structure that detects vehicles by changes in the coil's magnetic inductance field as ferrous metal from a vehicle passes through it. The electronic sensor in the controller cabinet detects changes in the magnetic field. The output from the sensor electronics is a 'switch' closure. This can be an electromechanical relay or a solid-state relay. The 'switch' is normally closed (NC) in the de-energized state but held open when power is applied to the circuit. This is called 'Fail-Call' so that if there is a failure in the sensor electronics, the output will place a 'Call' to the controller as if a vehicle is present on the loop detector.

Video (both normal and infrared) uses changes in the contrast of the image detection zone to detect traffic. All detection methods, except inductive loop detectors and magnetometers, suffer from reduced accuracy due to occlusion. This limits the camera's view in certain instances.

There are different categories of actuated signals. To save on maintenance costs, some agencies opt to design an intersection as semi-actuated. Semi-actuated means the intersection has detection only on the minor-street approaches and major-street left turns. The whole intersection is then programmed to operate for a fixed time every cycle, but the controller will service the other movements only when there is a 'call' or demand. An arterial series of signals operating in a semi-actuated or fixed mode, and importantly, with the same cycle length, can be coordinated. During signal coordination, most signal systems are typically designed to operate in a semi-actuated mode.

In fixed operation, a controller has a set time to service all movements every cycle. The controller will service all movements, whether or not there is vehicle demand. When a detector at an actuated signal breaks, that movement will then have to operate as fixed until the detector is repaired.

There are three general ways a signal can operate: FREE, COORD, and FLASH. In FREE operation, the signal runs according to its own demand and timing parameters, as determined by its detectors. It is not operating under any background cycle length. In COORD operation, short for coordination, the signal is running a background cycle length. Non-major street movements are usually still actuated, and the controller will rest on the major street until the background cycle length is fulfilled. The final mode is FLASH operation, in which all vehicle signal heads continuously display a flashing red, or the main street displays a flashing yellow while others display a flashing red. Pedestrian heads are dark.

When the volume of vehicles at an intersection no longer warrants keeping the signal active, the signal can switch to FLASH mode. When volume picks up again, the signal switches back into either FREE or COORD operation. For example, the daily operation of a signal may involve it being in FLASH mode early in the morning, COORD during the day, FREE in the evening, and back to FLASH late at night. It can also be set to flash until made not to, allowing it to essentially be converted into a beacon if the traffic light is obsolete enough.

== Basic timing functions ==
Several basic timing functions must be programmed for the traffic controller to operate.

MIN time determines the minimum duration of the green interval for each movement. Left turns, minor streets, and major streets usually have different MIN times. Left turns and minor side street intervals are often in the range from 4 to 10 seconds, while major streets often go higher than 15.

Gap, extension, or passage time determines the extendable portion of the green time for a movement. The movement remains in the extendable portion as long as an actuation is present and the passage timer has not expired. If the interval is set to 3 seconds and no vehicle is present after 3 seconds, the movement will terminate.

MAX time limits of a maximum time of the green interval. If there are no conflicting demands at the intersection, the controller will ignore the MAX and rest in the major-street movement.

Yellow Clearance determines the yellow time for the associated movement.

Red Clearance determines the all-red time for the associated movement.

Walk time provides the length of the walk indication.

Flashing Don't Walk is the duration of the flashing pedestrian clearance. This is timed as the length of the crosswalk divided by a speed of 3.5 feet per second, minus the yellow clearance for the adjacent vehicle movement.

Cycle Length controls the time from one major street yellow to the next major street yellow for purposes of coordination. The master controller often sets it for the specific plan in use. This is also used if the signal has no detectors attached.

Offset controls the timing of the start of the major street green and/or the end of the major street green, to keep the signal in coordination with other signals in the overall timing plan. The master controller can set this timing for the specific plan in use.

== Coordination ==
Coordination (the more correct term is progression) refers to the timing of the signals so that a "platoon" of cars traveling on a street arrives at a succession of green lights and proceeds through multiple intersections without stopping. A well-coordinated signal system can enhance traffic flow, reduce delay, and minimize pollution. However, it is not always possible to retain progression throughout a network of signals. It is also difficult to maintain signal progression on a two-way street. An early traffic engineer Henry Barnes, who served as Commissioner of Traffic in many cities, including Baltimore, Maryland and New York City, developed coordinated traffic signal timings so that large amounts of traffic could be accommodated on major traffic arterials.

Traffic signal timing is a very complex topic. For example, timing a 'WALK' signal for a wide pedestrian crossing and slower pedestrians (for example, older people) could result in very long waits for vehicles, thereby increasing the likelihood of cars running the light, which could cause accidents. Therefore, optimizing the safety of intersections involves multiple factors, such as street width, lane width, the number of intersecting streets, the availability of electricity for a signal, the number of cars per unit of time, the evenness or unevenness of flow, the number and types of pedestrians, and many other factors.

Traffic signals can be programmed to have different signal timing plans, depending on the time of day. Some signal control systems adapt signal timings depending on measured traffic conditions.

== Research ==
Standardizing signal timing procedures, standards, and best practices has been completed through the Signal Timing Manual, sponsored by the Federal Highway Administration. The Signal Timing Manual is a tabletop resource compiled by Kittelson & Associates, Inc., the Texas Transportation Institute, the Institute of Transportation Engineers (ITE), and the University of Maryland.

In March 2020, the ITE adopted Beaverton, Oregon engineering consultant Mats Järlström's recommendations for yellow light timing. Järlström had begun investigating the matter after his wife received a ticket from a red light camera in 2013. After he published his findings, the state of Oregon fined him for practicing engineering without a license. Järlström, who has a degree in electrical engineering, filed suit in the federal District Court alleging violation of his First Amendment rights. The court agreed with him, ruling that the state could not restrict the use of the word "engineer".

== Design process ==
Signal timing is an iterative process. A typical signal timing involves the following steps:

1. Determine an appropriate phase plan
2. Calculate the corresponding lane volume in terms of through vehicle units, or TVUs, by converting turning vehicular flows into their through traffic equivalent time, factoring in road geometries.
3. Determine corresponding time lost due to red, yellow, and start/clearance. Determine the cycle time to accommodate the traffic flow and the lost time.
4. Split the green time among different traffic phases proportional to the critical lane volumes of each phase.
5. Adjust for pedestrian crossing requirements.

== Signal Phase and Timing (SPaT) ==
Signal Phase and Timing (SPaT) data refers to messages that indicate which signals are green, yellow, or red and, in some cases, the time remaining to cross an intersection.

Currently, SPaT transmits to vehicles using either DSRC (Dedicated Short Range Communications) or V2X (Vehicle to Everything).

In fixed-time traffic control systems, SPAT information may be definitive; however, it is indicative in adaptive systems.

The collection of signal timing data using SPaT was discussed at an ITS/STI Canada conference in 2018.

=== In the European Union ===
As of 2025, there were at least 54 cities with C-Roads coverage and over 2700 Road Side Units.

A map of C-ITS roadside units in the EU is published. It shows ITS-G5 locations, as well as cellular locations. As of August 2026, the latest ITS-G5 and cellular data was from the end of 2025.

=== In New South Wales, Australia ===
Transport for NSW (a transport agency in New South Wales, Australia) is trialing sharing this data with transport customers, with a focus on visually and mobility-impaired customers.

SPaT is supported by Sydney Coordinated Adaptive Traffic System using the Cit-e product. Cit-e aims to improve driver behaviour, increase productivity of vehicles, and analyse data to improve network performance and optimisation.

In 2013, the Sydney Coordinated Adaptive Traffic System team published a 3 minute video demonstrating a SPaT trial in SCATS. The demo was for the ITS Australia Summit in September 2013. The demonstration showcased SPaT and MAP messages being sent at Henderson Road and Mitchell Road (intersection ID 934).

In 2016, an initial 3-month field trial was planned at 116 intersections along 3 freight corridors across Sydney, including Pennant Hills Road, Parramatta Road, and King Georges Road, using a Cohda Wireless MK5 unit in 116 trucks.

By April 2018, 7 signalised intersections in NSW were broadcasting signal phase and timing information.

An automated vehicle trial in Chippendale, New South Wales concluded in mid-2023. It utilised Cohda Wireless MK5 transceivers to communicate over V2X networks.

The Sydney Coordinated Adaptive Traffic System (SCATS) and Future Mobility teams retrofitted existing traffic lights with a Roadside Unit (RSU). The roadside unit uses DSRC to send SPaT and MAP messages to the vehicle's on-board unit (OBU). Vehicle-to-traffic light communications were tested.

In 2024, expansion from 3 to over 30 intersections was planned.
