= Aimsun =

Software company

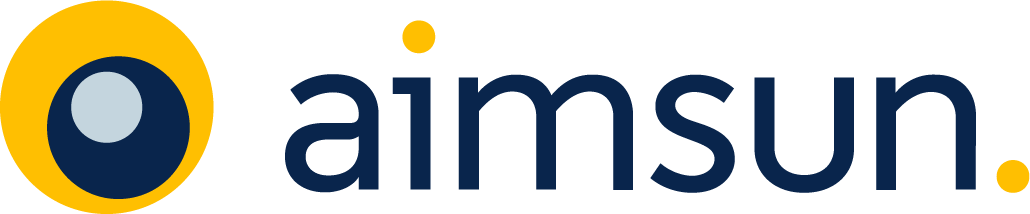
- Industry: Simulation software
- Founded: 1997
- Parent: Yunex Traffic
- Website: aimsun.com

Aimsun (short for "Advanced Interactive Microscopic Simulator for Urban and Non-Urban Networks") is a software company that provides simulation software and services for transportation planning and traffic management.

== Overview ==
Aimsun was founded in 1997 and developed Aimsun Next traffic modeling software, which simulates mobility in networks.

Aimsun also develops Aimsun Live, which is a simulation-based traffic forecasting software as well as Aimsun Auto for studying path planning in driverless vehicles, and Aimsun Ride for modeling demand-responsive transportation services.

Aimsun was acquired by Siemens in 2018 for an undisclosed sum, as part of the Siemens Mobility Intelligent Traffic Systems (ITS) unit.

In 2021, Siemens Mobility carved out the Intelligent Traffic Systems (ITS) unit, of which Aimsun is a part, and renamed it Yunex Traffic.

In 2022, Italian infrastructure group Mundys (then known as Atlantia) bought Siemens' Yunex Traffic division for 950 million euros ($1.1 billion) to expand its transport services, making Aimsun a part of the Mundys group.

== Transport models ==
- Paris (Aimsun Paris match)
- London (Transport for London, Aimsun Next platform)
- Sydney
- New York City
- Abu Dhabi (Aimsun Abu Dhabi transport model)
- Singapore (Aimsun Live Technology Trial in Singapore)
- Bergen (Aimsun smart traffic management pilot in Norway)
- Western Australia (Transport predictive solution)

== Aimsun live ==
Aimsun Live
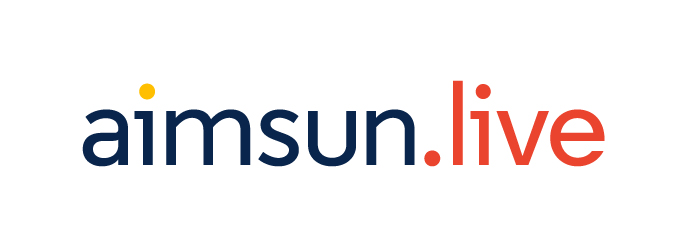
- Developer: Aimsun
- Stable release: Aimsun Live / 2008
- Type: Traffic forecasting, transportation forecasting, road traffic control, congestion planning
- License: Software license agreement
- Website: aimsun.com

Aimsun Live is a traffic forecasting software, developed and marketed by Aimsun. Traffic control centers use Aimsun Live (formerly Aimsun Online) to make real-time decisions about the management of a road network. It is used to forecast future traffic conditions based on the current state of the network and to evaluate incident response or traffic management strategies.

Aimsun Live connects with the traffic control center, continuously processing live field data. By combining these live traffic data feeds and simulations with the emulation of congestion mitigation strategies, Aimsun Live can accurately forecast the future network flow patterns that will result from a particular traffic management or information provision strategy. Aimsun Live was launched in 2008 and is now fully deployed on Interstate 15 in San Diego, Grand Lyon in France, and other locations worldwide.

It uses live traffic data feeds and simulations to forecast future traffic conditions for large Urban areas and regional networks. It analyzes real-time inputs from disparate sources of information, such as field traffic controllers, detectors, incident reports and live data feeds from key intersections. Using up-to-date field data, Aimsun Live identifies, retrieves, and loads a travel demand matrix for the road network being managed. It finds the closest match between the data received in real time and several demand patterns stored in a database. The demand pattern database is created in a prior step by carrying out an analysis of historical data.

=== Real-time simulation ===
This step involves the dynamic (mesoscopic or microscopic) simulation of one or more scenarios in real time. Each scenario is simulated on a dedicated computer. The simulations produce dynamic forecasts of traffic conditions at a detailed, local level for the next 30–60 minutes. Each simulation considers a concrete set of actions that might be applied in order to improve the network situation. One of the scenarios always corresponds to the ‘do nothing' case.

The area included in the simulation model depends on the type of network being managed. It is typically defined using equilibrium assignment techniques, which evaluate at a high level the impact of local but significant capacity changes on the rest of the network. The objective is to exclude areas that are unlikely to be affected by incidents or responses to those incidents.

Simulations typically last 1–3 minutes depending on hardware specifications, network size and level of congestion (number of vehicles). These simulations are run in 'batch mode' (without animation in 2D or 3D) in order to improve performance.

Response information is presented visually online to provide support for operational decision making. Traffic control operators are provided with quick snapshots of predicted traffic flow and performance indicators for different control alternatives.

=== Other features ===
- Customization to work with traffic control software
- Assimilation of new data to improve the quality of predictions over time

=== Practical uses ===
- Online travel information systems
- Dynamic emergency vehicle routing
- Emissions management
- Accident response strategy assessments
- Urban and interurban congestion management
- Security threat mitigation and large-scale evacuation management

=== Project examples ===
Aimsun Live is or has been used to inform operational decisions for:

- Network Emissions / Vehicle Flow Management Adjustment toolkit (NEVFMA) in collaboration with Oxfordshire County Council, EarthSense and Siemens Mobility. An Aimsun Live deployment, with integrated air dispersion modeling.
- Central Florida Regional Integrated Corridor Management System for Florida DOT in collaboration with Southwest Research Institute. Aimsun Live is the predictive engine that will analyze and forecast the effectiveness of response plans to mitigate congestion.
- Wiesbaden: DIGI-V - for the City of Wiesbaden. Aimsun is working in collaboration with Siemens Mobility to help lower traffic-related nitrogen oxide emissions with an extensive air pollution control package covering all areas of mobility. To achieve this reduction in traffic-related emissions, extensive environmental and traffic data will be recorded, analyzed and processed in real time.
- Sydney: M4 Smart Motorway System - for Transport for New South Wales. Aimsun Live is the traffic prediction software at the heart of the NSW Government's M4 Smart Motorway project. The project uses real-time data, communications and ITS to improve traffic flow.
- Singapore: 2019 technology trial for real-time traffic simulation and prediction - Land Transport Authority of Singapore (LTA). Aimsun collaborated with the Land Transport Authority of Singapore (LTA) to develop a real-time traffic simulation and predictive system in Aimsun Live.
- Integrated Corridor Management Project on Interstate 15, San Diego, CA - for SANDAG. In 2014 and again in 2016, the project received the Operational Efficiency Program of the Year award from the California Transportation Foundation.
- Leicester: Urban Traffic Management and Air Quality (uTRAQ) study for the European Space Agency in collaboration with TRL and the University of Leicester. Satellite-generated atmospheric data helped local authorities to devise real-time traffic management strategies for reducing pollution levels.
- OPTICITIES - Grand Lyon. This three-year, EC-backed pilot project showed how prediction tools could help traffic center operators anticipate and mitigate congestion, particularly at peak times.
- M30, Madrid, Spain Aimsun built and implemented a simulation-based traffic forecasting system for traffic evacuation and incident response operations in the Madrid traffic control center.

== Recognition ==
- Highways Industry category award for Aimsun’s air quality modelling solution at the Highways Awards.
- Smart Transport Infrastructure Award (M4 Smart Motorway Project – Simulation-Based Support for Smart Motorway Infrastructure)
- Won Excellence in Research and Development Award by ITS for Sydney Victoria Road Intelligent Decision Support System
