= Advanced traffic management system =

Intelligent transportation system domain

The advanced traffic management system (ATMS) field is a primary subfield within the intelligent transportation system (ITS) domain, and is used in the United States. The ATMS view is a top-down management perspective that integrates technology primarily to improve the flow of vehicle traffic and improve safety. Real-time traffic data from cameras, speed sensors, etc. flows into a transportation management center (TMC) where it is integrated and processed (e.g. for incident detection), and may result in actions taken (e.g. traffic routing, DMS messages) with the goal of improving traffic flow. The National ITS Architecture defines the following primary goals and metrics for ITS:

- Increase transportation system efficiency
- Enhance mobility
- Improve safety
- Reduce fuel consumption and environmental cost
- Increase economic productivity
- Create an environment for an ITS market

== History ==
In 1956, the National Interstate and Defense Highways Act initiated a 35-year $114 billion program that designed and constructed the interstate highway system. This hugely successful program was mostly complete by 1991, and the era of build-out was over. In the mid to late 1980s transportation officials from federal and state governments, the private sector, and universities began a series of informal meetings discussing the future of transportation. This included meetings held by the California Department of Transportation (Caltrans) in October 1986 to discuss technology applied to future advanced highways. In June 1988 in Washington, DC, the group formalized its structure and chose the name "Mobility 2000". In 1990, Mobility 2000 morphed into ITS America, the main ITS advocacy and policy group in the US. The initial name of ITS America was IVHS America and was changed in 1994 to reflect a broader intermodal perspective. The 1991 Intermodal Surface Transportation Efficiency Act (ISTEA) was the first post-build-out transportation act. It initiated a new approach focused on efficiency, intelligence, and intermodalism. It had a primary goal of providing "the foundation for the nation to compete in the global economy". This new mixture of infrastructure and technology was identified as an intelligent transportation system (ITS) and was the centerpiece of the 1991 ISTEA act. ITS is loosely defined as "the application of computers, communications, and sensor technology to surface transportation". Subsequent surface transportation bills have continued ITS funding and development. In 2005 the SAFETEA-LU (Safe, Accountable, Flexible, Efficient Transportation Equity Act: A Legacy for Users) surface transportation spending bill was signed into law.

== Functional areas ==
- Real-time traffic monitoring
- Dynamic message sign monitoring and control
- Incident monitoring
- Traffic camera monitoring and control
- Active traffic management (ATM)
- Chain control
- Ramp meter monitoring and control
- Arterial management
- Traffic signal monitoring and control
- Automated warning systems
- Road Weather Information System (RWIS) monitoring
- Highway advisory radio
- Urban traffic management and control

== Systems ==
- IRIS open-source ATMS Project
- Georgia Navigator
- Kimley-Horn Integrated Transportation System (KITS)

== See also ==
- Traffic optimization
- Speed limit: variable speed limits
- Variable-message sign
- PTV Group
