= IRIS (transportation software) =

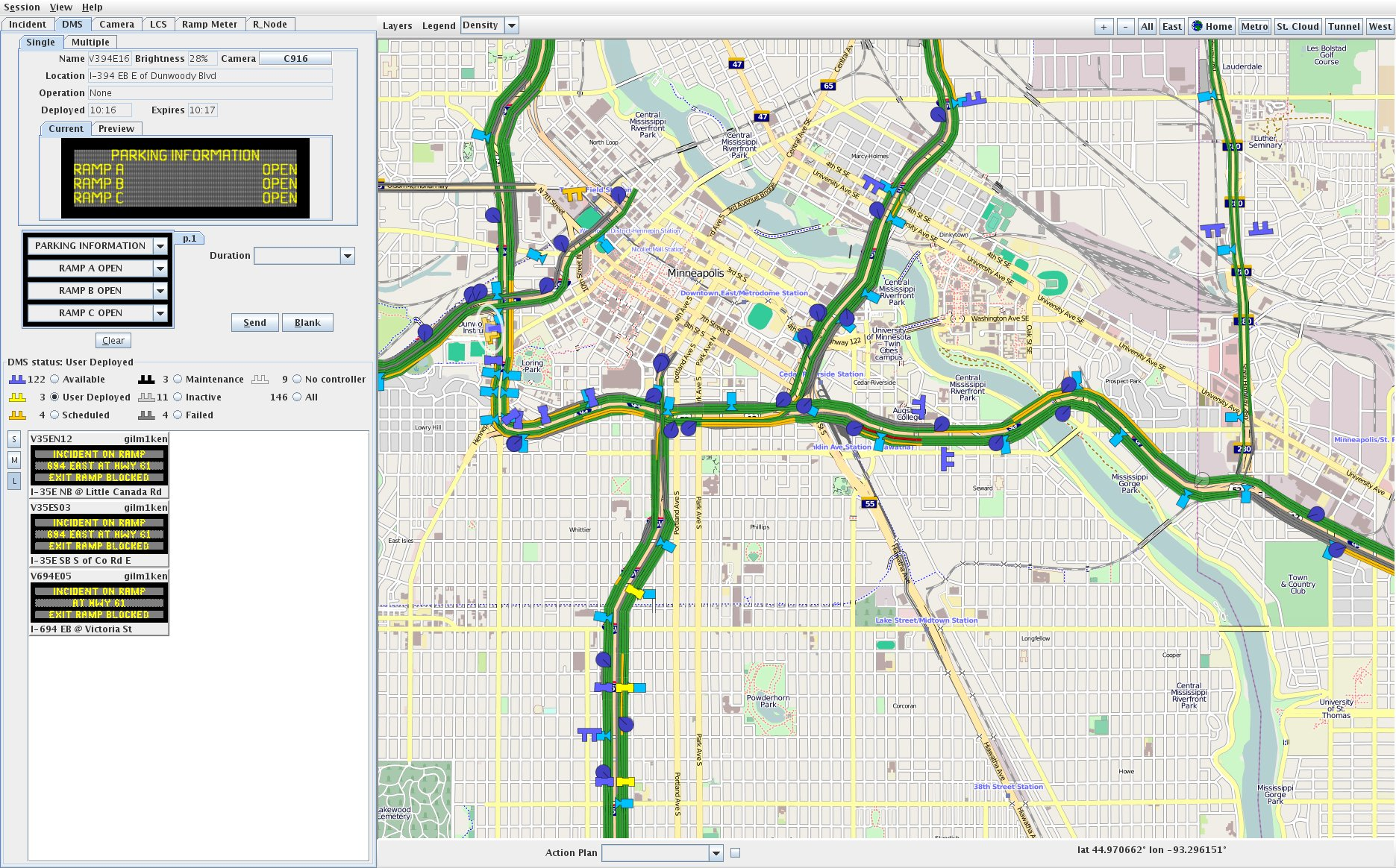
- Screenshot of IRIS DMS functionality and map
- Developer: Minnesota Department of Transportation
- Release: May 2007
- Written in: Java
- Available in: English, uses I18N
- Type: ATMS
- License: GNU General Public License (V2)
- Website: iris.dot.state.mn.us

IRIS (Intelligent Roadway Information System) is an open-source Advanced Traffic Management System (ATMS) software project developed by the Minnesota Department of Transportation. It is used by transportation agencies to monitor and manage interstate and highway traffic. IRIS uses the GPL license.

== Functional areas ==
- Variable speed limit monitoring and control
- Active traffic management and lane control
- Congestion Detection
- Automated Warning System (AWS)
- Road Weather Information Systems (RWIS) / Environmental Sensor Stations (ESS)
- Dynamic message sign monitoring and control
- Ramp meter monitoring and control
- Traffic camera monitoring and control
- Vehicle Detector Stations (VDS) for monitoring real-time vehicle speed, flow, density
- Toll tags
- Incident tracking, monitoring, and storage
- Data export: real-time traffic, incidents, configuration, etc.
- Integrated mapping

== Supported hardware devices ==
- DMS
  - NTCIP Class A, B, C
    - ADDCO Inc.
    - Daktronics Inc.
    - SES America Inc., full matrix DMS, character matrix DMS
    - Skyline: full sized DMS, VSL, scroll signs
    - Wanco portable DMS
  - DMS XML: a simple XML protocol for interfacing with external DMS systems
- Road Weather Information System
  - NTCIP 1204 device driver, validated with:
    - Lufft Lcom
    - Campbell Scientific CR1000
    - Vaisala dmc586
    - QTT LX-RPU Elite
    - High Sierra Electronics ESS
  - Optical Scientific ORG-815 Optical Rain Gauge
  - SSI
- Traffic cameras
  - PTZ: Manchester, Pelco D, Vicon, Infinova
  - Switchers: Pelco, Vicon
- VDS
  - Canoga
  - Wavetronix SmartSensor 105
  - Wavetronix SmartSensor 125
  - EIS RTMS (UDP)
  - EIS G4
  - Caltrans URMS 2070: UDP, TCP, TCP Re-ID
  - Sensys
- Tag readers
  - Bluetooth: Iteris Velocity
  - Bluetooth: Acyclica
  - Transcore Encompass 6 Multiprotocol Reader

== Minneapolis / Saint Paul IRIS System ==
The IRIS implementation in the Minneapolis – Saint Paul region consists of:

- DMS: 135
- VDS: 5452
- RWIS: 4
- Cameras: 476
- Ramp meters: 433
- LCS: 194 (most can also be used as DMS)
- Lane marking: 1 (in-road lighting)
- Static sign with wig-wag beacons: 2

== Gallery ==
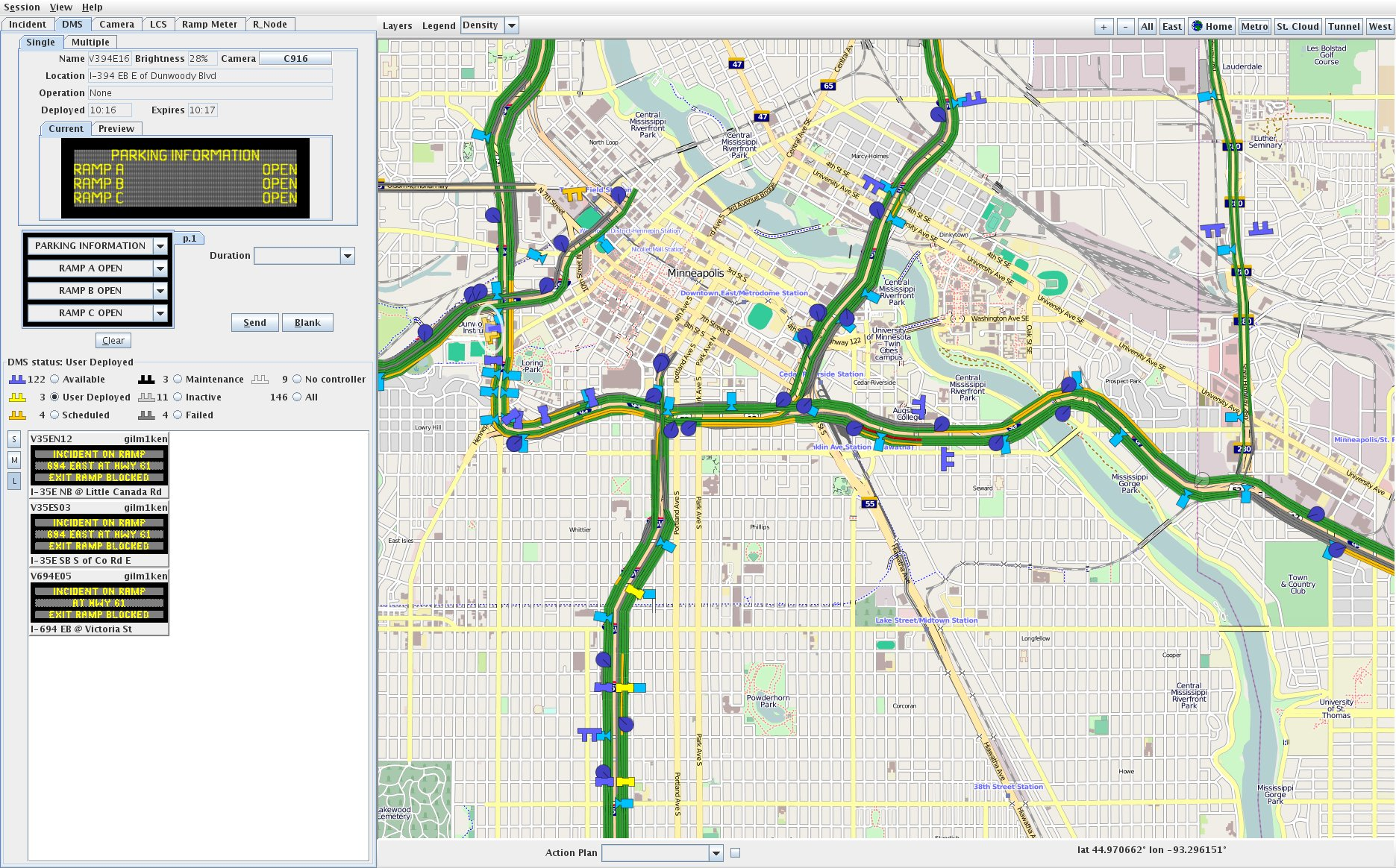
Screenshot of Minnesota Department of Transportation IRIS Client.

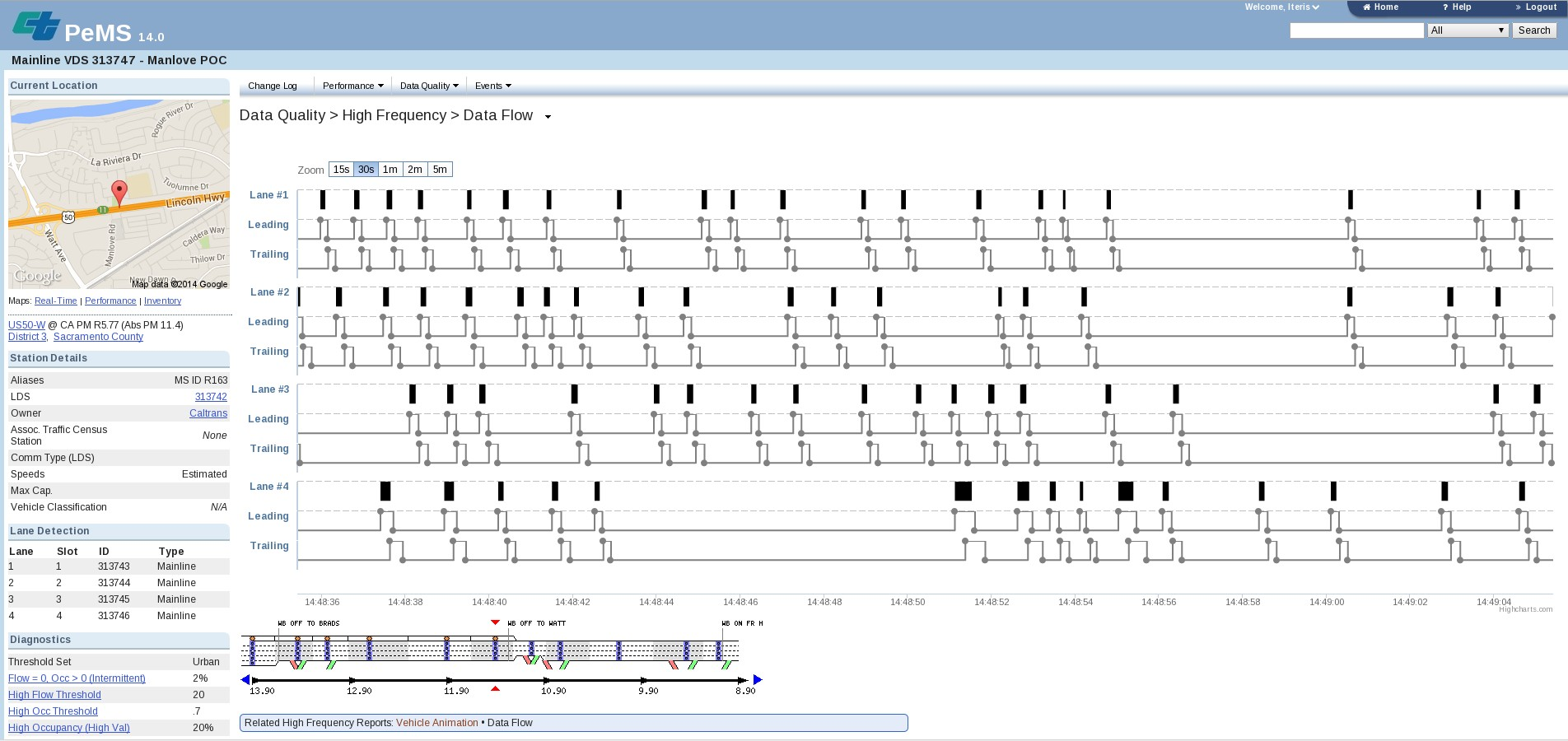
Real-time 1 kHz loop data collected with IRIS.

== Transportation agencies using IRIS ==
- Minnesota Department of Transportation
- California Department of Transportation
- Nebraska Department of Transportation
- Wyoming Department of Transportation
- Wisconsin Department of Transportation

== See also ==
- Traffic flow
- Traffic congestion
