= Managed lane =

Type of highway lane

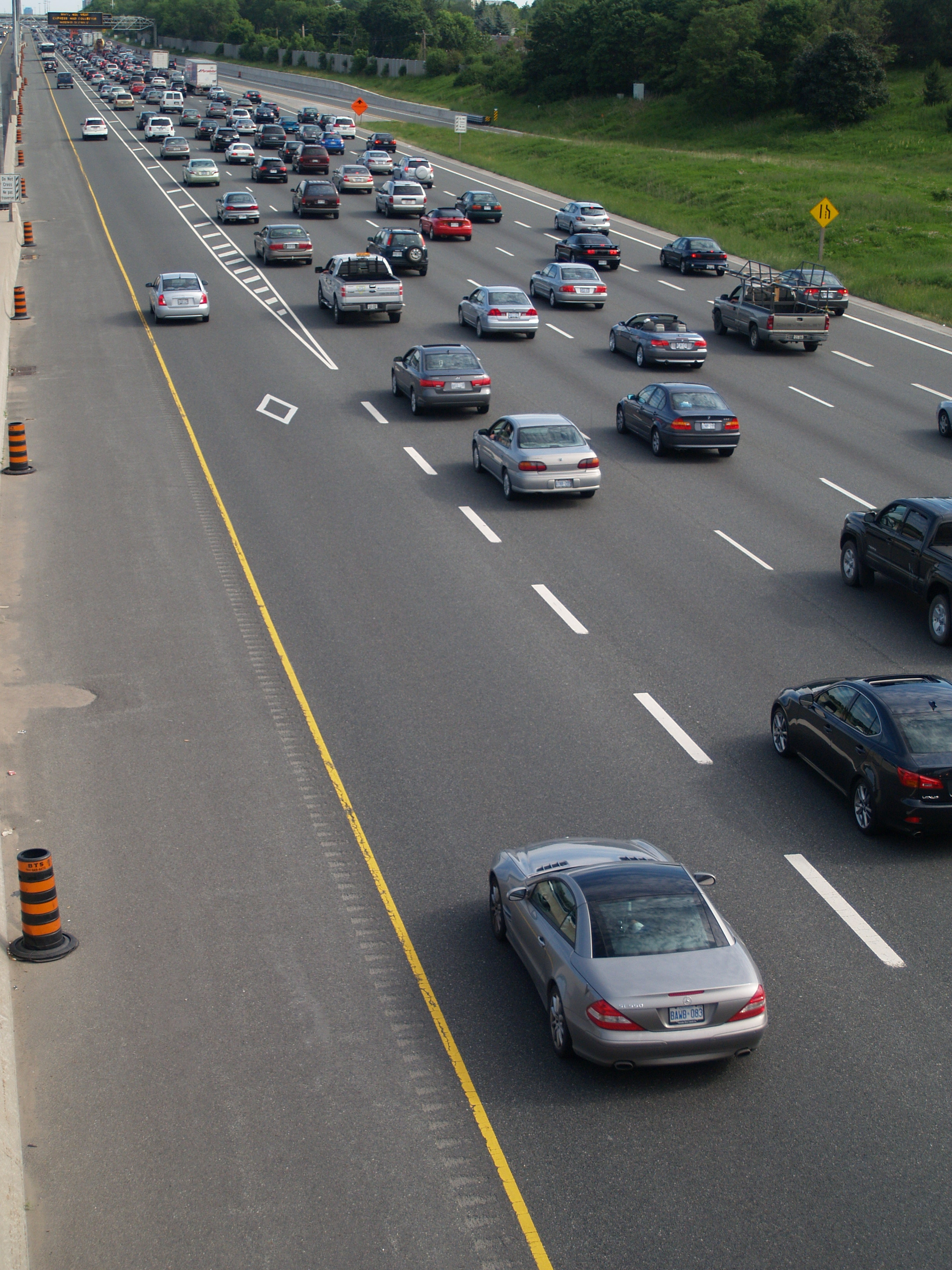
An HOV lane on Ontario Highway 404 incentivizes higher-occupancy vehicles by providing a quicker commute during peak hours

A managed lane is a type of highway lane that is operated with a management scheme, such as lane use restrictions or variable tolling, to optimize traffic flow, vehicle throughput, or both. Definitions and goals vary among transport agencies, but managed lanes are generally implemented to achieve an improved operational condition on a highway, such as improving traffic speed and throughput, reducing air pollution, and improving safety. Types of managed lanes include high-occupancy vehicle (HOV) lanes, high-occupancy toll lanes, express toll lanes, reversible lanes, and bus lanes. Most managed lane facilities are located in the United States and Canada, although HOV and bus lanes can be found in many other countries; outside of the US and Canada, many countries use active traffic management that manage all lanes of a highway.

== Definition ==
The definition of a managed lane varies among transport agencies. The United States' Federal Highway Administration describes managed lanes as "highway facilities or a set of lanes where operational strategies are proactively implemented and managed in response to changing conditions". The FHWA notes that among US transport agencies, definitions of managed lanes contain three basic elements:

- "The managed lane concept is typically a 'freeway-within-a-freeway' where a set of lanes within the freeway cross section is separated from the general-purpose lanes."
- "The facility incorporates a high degree of operational flexibility so that over time operations can be actively managed to respond to growth and changing needs."
- "The operation of and demand on the facility is managed using a combination of tools and techniques in order to continuously achieve an optimal condition, such as free-flow speeds."

The Texas Department of Transportation defines a managed lane as "one that increases freeway efficiency by packaging various operational and design actions. Lane management operations may be adjusted at any time to better match regional goals." Typical goals and objectives for managed lanes are improved traffic efficiency, increased traffic throughput, improved safety, and reduction of pollution to meet regional air quality goals.

If designed to improve travel conditions on a highway, the following types of lanes can be considered managed lanes: High-occupancy vehicle (HOV) lanes, tolled lanes built within or along an existing highway (express toll lanes), high-occupancy toll (HOT) lanes, reversible lanes (British: tidal flow), truck lanes, interchange bypass lanes (usually for HOV, truck, or mass transit only), bus lanes, use of shoulders by traffic in certain circumstances (dynamic shoulder lanes), and dual/parallel highways of which one is managed.

Managed lanes are essentially a limited application of active traffic management to only some of a highway's lanes, rather than all lanes of the highway.

== Reasons for managed lanes ==
The most important prerequisite condition necessary for managed lane demand to materialize is the presence of recurring traffic congestion. Managed lanes are by definition a congestion management strategy and have benefits that are only fully realized in the context of frequent traffic congestion that causes significant travel time delays and uncertainty over trip time reliability. Although there is no broadly accepted definition of what constitutes traffic congestion, congestion is generally identified as a breakdown in the flow of traffic and a reduction in vehicle speeds caused by traffic demand approaching or exceeding available roadway capacity. These situations generally correspond to a level of service of D or worse (on a scale A-F, with A being highest) and average travel speeds of 30 mph or less, although this does not mean that other scenarios are not suitable for managed lane strategies.

The specific characteristics of the traffic demand that exists in a corridor are particularly important when considering managed lane strategies. Traffic demand on urban roadways is typically variable and changes depending on the time of day, day of the week, and by season. It is common for demand in some radial corridors to be highly directional, with demand for facilities leading into a central business district often being highest in the morning peak periods and demand for outbound directions being highest in the afternoon periods. These patterns cause an imbalance of demand that require solutions that are flexible in their ability to accommodate variable and directional traffic volumes. Routes that connect suburban trips may exhibit bi-directional demand and be congested for more prolonged periods, so the selected concept needs to recognize this. Demand may exist for one particular mode, say transit for a radial corridor, and not for another. Each type of demand should be separately analyzed, even if they will share the managed lane facility.

== Strategies for implementation ==
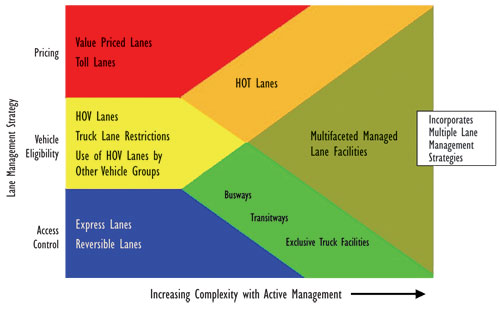
Types of managed lanes grouped by strategy and complexity

Strategies for managing lanes typically fall into one of three categories. These include pricing, vehicle eligibility, and access control. Most managed lane implementation incorporate the application of multiple management strategies. In the United States, managed lanes are almost always located within the right-of-way of freeways, often on the left or "high speed" side of the mainlanes, but sometimes on the right lane or shoulder lane for short distances. Agencies often combine lane management strategies and applications of various intelligent transportation systems (ITS) and traffic control devices to address both safety and operation needs. Examples include:

- Employing static signing to notify drivers of eligibility to use a dedicated lane and times indicating when restrictions are in place.
- Utilizing overhead lane control signals and/or changeable message signs to accommodate highly directional demand on reversible or contraflow lanes.
- Employing access treatment and lane separation strategies to manage the speed differential often associated with managed lanes.
- Increasing the level of automated and on-site monitoring, enforcement and incident response capability to help assure travel time reliability and safe operations.
- Implementing variable pricing through electronic tags that vary tolls by time of day or by demand to more efficiently utilize lane capacity.

Although managed lanes have traditionally been added as new capacity, the concept does not explicitly require capacity expansion. Instead, the focus of managed lanes is to preserve a reliable trip that is viewed as a preferable alternative over congestion that exists in the general purpose lanes. Therefore, the correct objective for managed lanes is not necessarily congestion relief, but rather, improved management of congestion that provides relief to users and non-users.

The rationale of implementation does not suggest that incorporation of managed lanes should be a stand-alone strategy. Indeed, the best applications are ones in which managed lanes are an integral component of a comprehensive congestion management program incorporating an array of other treatments and strategies. These treatments may include ramp metering, incident management, traffic demand management (TDM) such as vehicle for hire promotion, and associated programs that are both complementary and synergistic to overall regional mobility goals. For example, restricted lanes for buses and carpools only make sense and draw sufficient patronage when parallel programs including transit services, park-and-ride / park-and-pool lots and trip matching are implemented. Ramp and connector metering offers the opportunity to provide bypass lanes for transit and other transportation modes to attract demand.

The rationale for application is predicated on an understanding of the specific operational problem evidenced and forecasted to exist. The design should not define the operational need, but rather respond to the intended operation and attempt to fit within the specific corridor constraints that are often present. For example, highly directional congestion (i.e., inbound in the morning and outbound in the evening) may be addressed by a variety of different treatments such as concurrent, reversible or contraflow operations, and each will require a different design that may or may not fit within the corridor. The presence of congestion in both directions during the same daily commute may suggest only a bi-directional, concurrent flow operation (e.g., one dedicated lane operating in each direction) is appropriate. Similarly, the specific operational attributes of how many hours the managed lane is active, where access is applied and who can use it are determined in successive levels of evaluating the observed and forecast operational problems.

== Types of managed lanes ==
=== Pricing(1) ===
==== Toll managed lanes ====
Sign for express toll lanes, compliant with the Manual on Uniform Traffic Control Devices

Toll managed lanes use tolling, with electronic toll collection, (ETC), to manage the traffic flow of the managed lane.

Toll managed lanes should be contrasted with a regular toll road, as regular toll roads have the toll apply for every single lane, not just a few. Furthermore, express toll lanes should be contrasted with express lanes (as express lanes do not charge any toll).

The most general form of toll managed lanes are express toll lanes (ETL), which have variable tolls to maintain a higher throughput or speed in the ETL lane compared with the other lanes of the highway. ETLs are essentially access restricted tollroads within the freeway right-of-way that are actively managed to preserve free-flow operating conditions. The tolls are frequently changed to maintain a steady flow of traffic; in some cases, the goal of toll fluctuations is to maintain a minimum speed on the ETLs (e.g. 55 mph/85 km/h). As the lanes approach their capacity, tolls are increased to discourage vehicles from entering the ETLs.

A common variant of Express Toll Lanes (ETLs) are high-occupancy toll (HOT) lanes. HOT lanes are free for high-occupancy vehicles, while vehicles with fewer passengers pay a toll. Some types of vehicles may be exempt from tolls, such as hybrid vehicles (including single-occupant hybrid vehicles in HOT lanes), registered carpools (on ETLs), and motorcycles. Some toll managed lanes may only be tolled at certain times or charge different rates for high-occupancy vehicles.

Toll managed lanes are sometimes included in a highway reconstruction project to not only improve traffic, but also to fund the construction project itself (including improvements to existing lanes) through public-private partnerships (P3). In such highway reconstruction projects, the government transport agency tenders a P3 project in which a private consortium of companies designs, finances, and rebuilds a section of highway after which they are given a concession (e.g. 40 years) to operate the toll managed lanes, receiving fixed payouts from the relevant government transport agency for meeting performance criteria. These payments are used to repay the loans made by the private consortium, which keeps any excess as profit.

=== Vehicle Eligibility (2) ===
One of the most commonly used lane management tools for the past 40 years is restricting use based on vehicle eligibility. Eligibility can be defined in terms of vehicle type (i.e. buses, trucks, motorcycles, or hybrids) or by the number of occupants in a passenger vehicle, such as two or more (HOV 2+) or three or more (HOV 3+) in a vehicle. The latter definition represents the vast majority of managed lanes found in the US and Canada: HOV lanes.

==== HOV lanes ====
High-occupancy vehicle (HOV) lanes provide preferential treatment for transit, vanpools, carpools, and other designated vehicles by typically dedicating a lane or portion of the roadway for their exclusive use. The primary goal of HOV lanes is to increase the people moving capacity of a corridor and allow for more efficient use of freeways by increasing the number of occupants per vehicle. This is accomplished by providing travel time savings and reliability for high occupancy modes to incentivize carpooling and the use of transit.

HOV lanes are present on more than 1200 North American freeway route-miles (1900 route-kilometers), and are by far the most common form of managed lane. All HOV lanes accommodate buses, and sometimes other vehicles such as motorcycles and hybrids since the combined demand of each of these modes can usually be accommodated by a single lane. The majority of HOV facilities exist as single lanes that are concurrent with adjacent general purpose freeway lanes. Most commonly, HOV lanes are separated from mixed use lanes by a painted stripe or buffer, although some are separated by a physical barrier, either fixed or moveable. Depending on the design, HOV lanes may have continuous access to concurrent flow lanes or traffic may only be able to enter and exit at designated access locations. Some HOV lanes are reversible to serve directional demands at different times of the day; these facilities are separated by a permanent barrier and are accessed via exclusive ramps. Contraflow HOV lanes borrow an off-peak direction lane for peak commute purposes, and they use placement of pylons or moveable barriers to safely segregate oncoming traffic flow.

HOV lanes have also been added to highway onramps to bypass ramp meters, allowing HOV vehicles and buses to access the highway without queuing for the ramp meter. Such ramp lanes are known as HOV bypass ramps.

==== Bus lanes ====
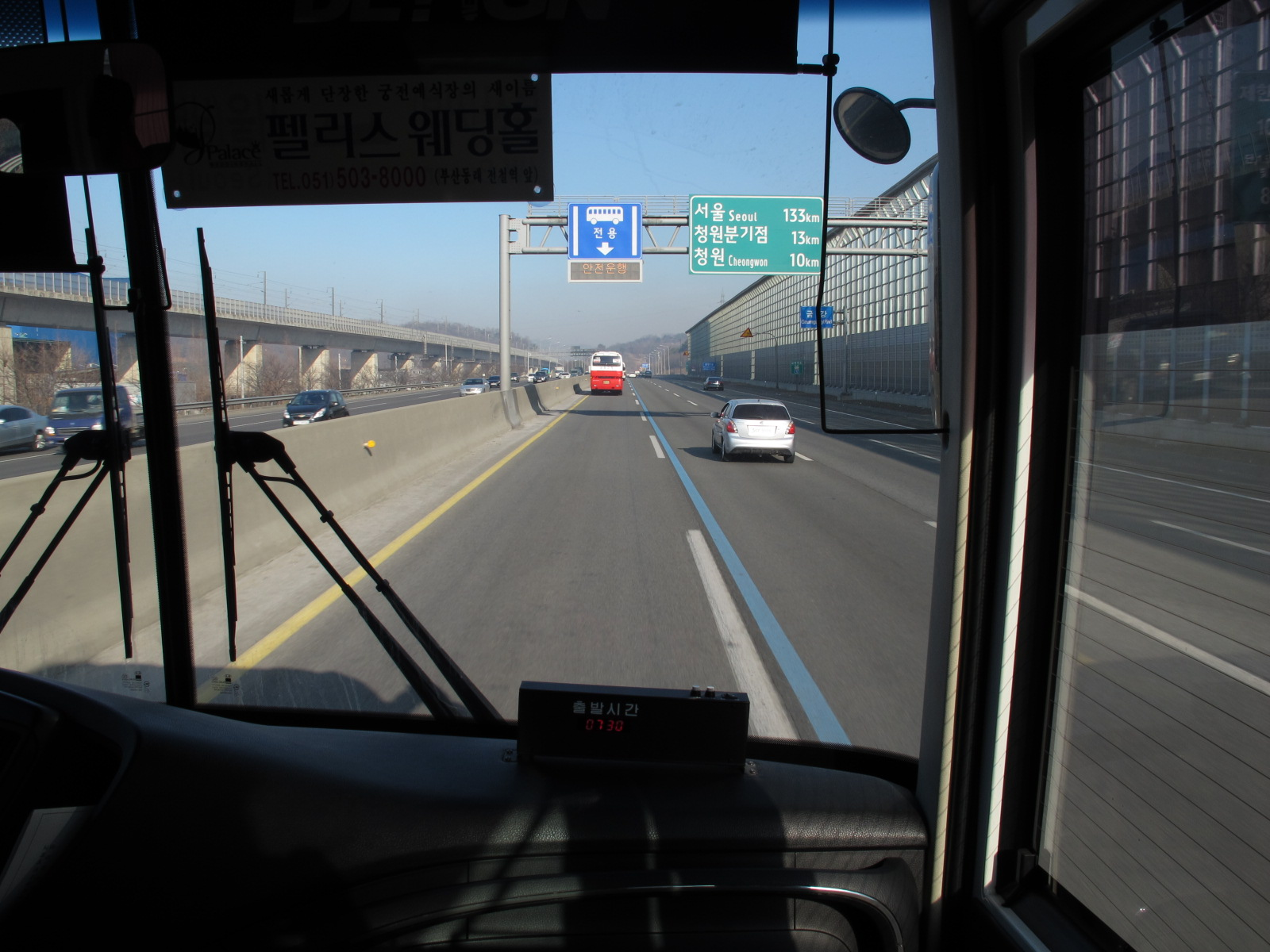
A dedicated bus lane (HOV 9+) on the Gyeongbu Expressway in South Korea

Bus lanes are lanes exclusively reserved for buses. A busway is a facility that is reserved for exclusive use by buses. A bus-lane, more commonly located on a major arterial or roadway on separate right-of-way, is usually a component of a bus rapid transit (BRT) system and as a result the terms bus-lane, busway, and BRT are sometimes used synonymously. However, there is a distinction between a lane dedicated to exclusive use by buses and BRT, which may include various operational improvements and station design features to provide high quality service for express bus trips. The type of service may also be substantially different, focused on limited express stops en route or point-to-point nonstop service.

Bus operation needs today are normally addressed and integrated into HOV lanes on freeway corridors that experience high levels of congestion and have high use or potential for bus transit services. The purpose of bus lanes and supporting facilities (e.g., transit stations, park-and-ride lots and direct access treatments) is to provide more reliable bus service by cutting down the delay that buses would have to otherwise incur in congested traffic, thereby increasing service efficiency by allowing more peak trips by the same bus and providing patrons a faster trip. Bus-lanes on freeway corridors are usually shared with HOVs and other designated vehicles since buses generally use little capacity. An example is the I-110 Harbor Transitway that carries buses and HOV-2+ vehicles in the median of the freeway. There are six bus stations along the Transitway that serve many bus routes including a BRT route. Although the Transitway serves all types of HOVs and will soon incorporate solo vehicle pricing, it includes several sections where bus-only lanes and separate roadways into stations for buses exist. Houston has a similar approach to serving express bus transit on reversible HOV lanes and express toll lanes with direct access ramps connecting stations and park-and-ride lots.

Some cities may have transit ways that are completely built from the start to be dedicated only to buses, such as the Mississauga Transitway near Toronto, Canada.

==== Truck lanes and lane restrictions ====
Separated roadways for trucks are uncommon. One example is the New Jersey Turnpike, the northern portion of which features completely separated dual roadways, one reserved for passenger cars only, and the other open to both commercial and non-commercial traffic. Access ramps are provided to both roadways at major interchanges (Figure 12). Light trucks are considered as eligible vehicles on some HOV lanes if they carry the requisite persons. Restricted geometrics on many existing concurrent leftmost median lanes limit opportunities to serve large commercial trucks, and sight distance and other freeway lane prohibitions typically mean these vehicles cannot use leftmost lane treatments unless a separate roadway is provided with a minimum of two travel lanes. There are truck lanes on European motorways leading in and out of the ports in Rotterdam in the Netherlands. In the US, dedicated roadways for trucks are being studied and in at least several cases proposed, but no freeway examples currently exist in the US. Missouri is currently considering using dedicated roadways for trucks on I-70 across the state, and several U.S. port cities are examining truck lanes and roadways. Climbing lanes for trucks typically are built to improve safe operations on grades by separating slow moving heavy vehicles from the rest of traffic.

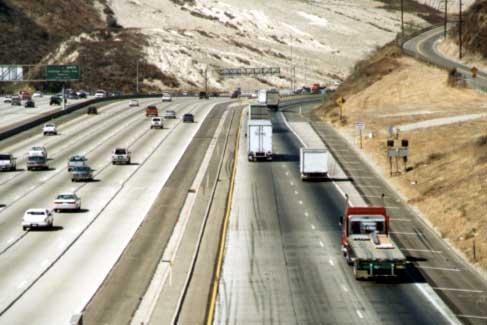
Truck lanes on Interstate 5 to bypass the interchange with Interstate 405 in Southern California

Interchange bypass lanes for trucks have been implemented in Southern California and Portland, Oregon, to improve safety by routing trucks around a major interchange typically containing left hand ramps. This design approach improves the merge condition affecting traffic operations at the interchange. Similar ramp options are provided for trucks on this separate roadway system as are provided for the mainlanes.

Far more common on US highways are lane restrictions which prohibit trucks from driving in certain lanes of a highway, typically the left-most lane. At least three travel lanes are normally needed to implement truck lane restrictions. Many US states have adopted this type of lane restriction because it promotes a more orderly mix of traffic and thereby improves throughput, increases sight distance in leftmost lanes, generally improves safety, and still permits the orderly movement of trucks.

=== Access Control (3) ===
==== Reversible Lanes ====
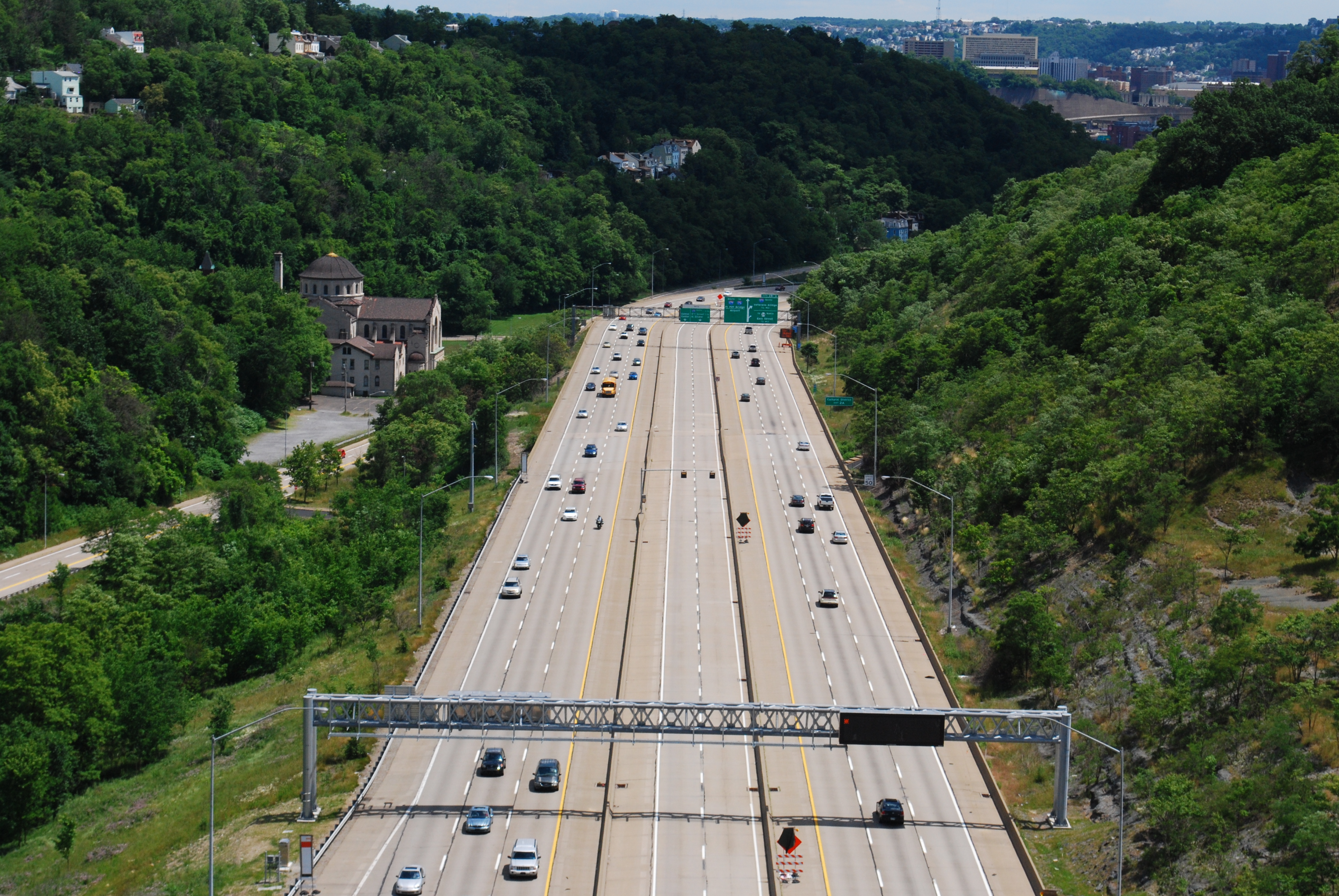
Reversible HOV lanes in the center of Interstate 279 near Pittsburgh

Reversible lanes are commonly employed when there is little or no available right-of-way for the width of a highway to be increased. These types of managed lanes increase the highway's capacity in the direction of the flow of these lanes, which is typically the direction of travel of the majority of traffic during peak hours (e.g. into a city center in the morning, out of a city center in afternoons/evenings). Reversible lanes along expressways are typically separated from other traffic lanes by concrete barriers and incorporate multiple gates or barriers to prevent traffic traveling in the opposite direction from entering these lanes. In some cases, they may not have a barrier (such is the case with the George Massey Tunnel in Delta, Canada).

A limitation of implementing a reversible flow design is that it cannot serve congestion that may be present in the off-peak traffic direction. If such is the case, then some users, such as deadheading transit buses that need trip reliability to make a second peak direction run during the commute period, will be adversely impacted. Freeway reversible lanes often can be separated by "Jersey" barriers in a high-speed roadway setting (which is not the case on arterial treatments). They are typically constructed in the median of freeway facilities and may be one, two or more lanes wide. These characteristics have several associated advantages and disadvantages.

A facility that changes direction to serve morning and afternoon traffic can be an efficient solution since it allocates capacity specifically to the most congested direction of travel. Reversible lanes offer a much higher guaranteed level of service for transit since side friction from adjacent traffic is removed. Some locales, notably Houston, implemented reversible lanes to address the peak direction alone since width was not available to address both directions of travel. Adapting a reversible flow lane or roadway into a freeway typically requires rebuilding most bridges with center columns. A disadvantage of reversible lanes is the ongoing cost of daily surveillance and lane/ramp reversal activities. These treatments must be designed to prevent wrong way movements, requiring extensive and redundant ITS (intelligent transportation system) and traffic control device treatments for each opening, plus a staff compliment who must visually inspect the roadway prior to each opening period. Management and enforcement is made easier by the barrier environment in which a single field location can be identified to monitor and/or toll all traffic flow.

==== Use of shoulders / Dynamic Shoulders ====
The use of a highway's shoulder during peak hours has been implemented in some locations, both in the US and Europe. The use of shoulders as travel lanes varies in practice, including use by buses only, use as an HOV lane, use for all vehicles, and use as an ETL/HOT lane. Others, such as the flex shoulder lane in Wisconsin's Madison Beltline are available to all vehicles under 5 tons when the lane is activated to open.

On Massachusetts State Route 3 (between Exit 27 and Exit 38) and I-93 (between Exit 35 and Exit 43) in the Boston area, all vehicles except trucks are permitted on shoulders during peak periods only, from 6-10:00 AM in the inbound direction and 3-7:00 PM in the outbound direction. Similarly, in Virginia on I-66, the shoulder carries general purpose traffic from 5:30–11:00 AM (eastbound) and 2:00–8:00 PM (westbound); however, during this time, the interior general purpose lane is open to HOV traffic only. I-66 uses extensive traffic signals and signage in order to communicate the active times of service. In the Seattle area, the right shoulder on the US 2 trestle near Everett is opened to all traffic in the eastbound direction during the afternoon peak period. A similar operation is provided on H1 in Honolulu in the morning peak on the right shoulder.

The use of freeway right side breakdown shoulders by buses is permitted in several states. This is known as bus-on-shoulder lanes, and can be incorporated with Bus Rapid Transit. The Minneapolis/St. Paul metropolitan area has the most bus-only shoulders in the United States. Early implementations of bus-only use of shoulders in the region were limited to arterial roads, but the concept was soon expanded to freeways after they were shown to be safe and hugely successful. As of 2006, there were 271 miles (436 km) bus-only shoulders on freeways in the Minneapolis/St. Paul metropolitan area. The Minnesota Department of Transportation has instituted a series of guidelines that govern the use of freeway shoulders by buses. These guidelines allow buses to use the shoulder only when mainline speeds are less than 35 miles per hour (56 km/h) and prohibit buses from exceeding the speed of adjacent traffic by more than 15 mph (24 km/h), up to a maximum speed of 35 mph (56 km/h). A similar law was passed in Colorado in early 2016 for the RTD Flatiron Flyer bus route on U.S. 36 along the Denver-Boulder corridor.
