= Active traffic management =

Methods of smoothing traffic flow

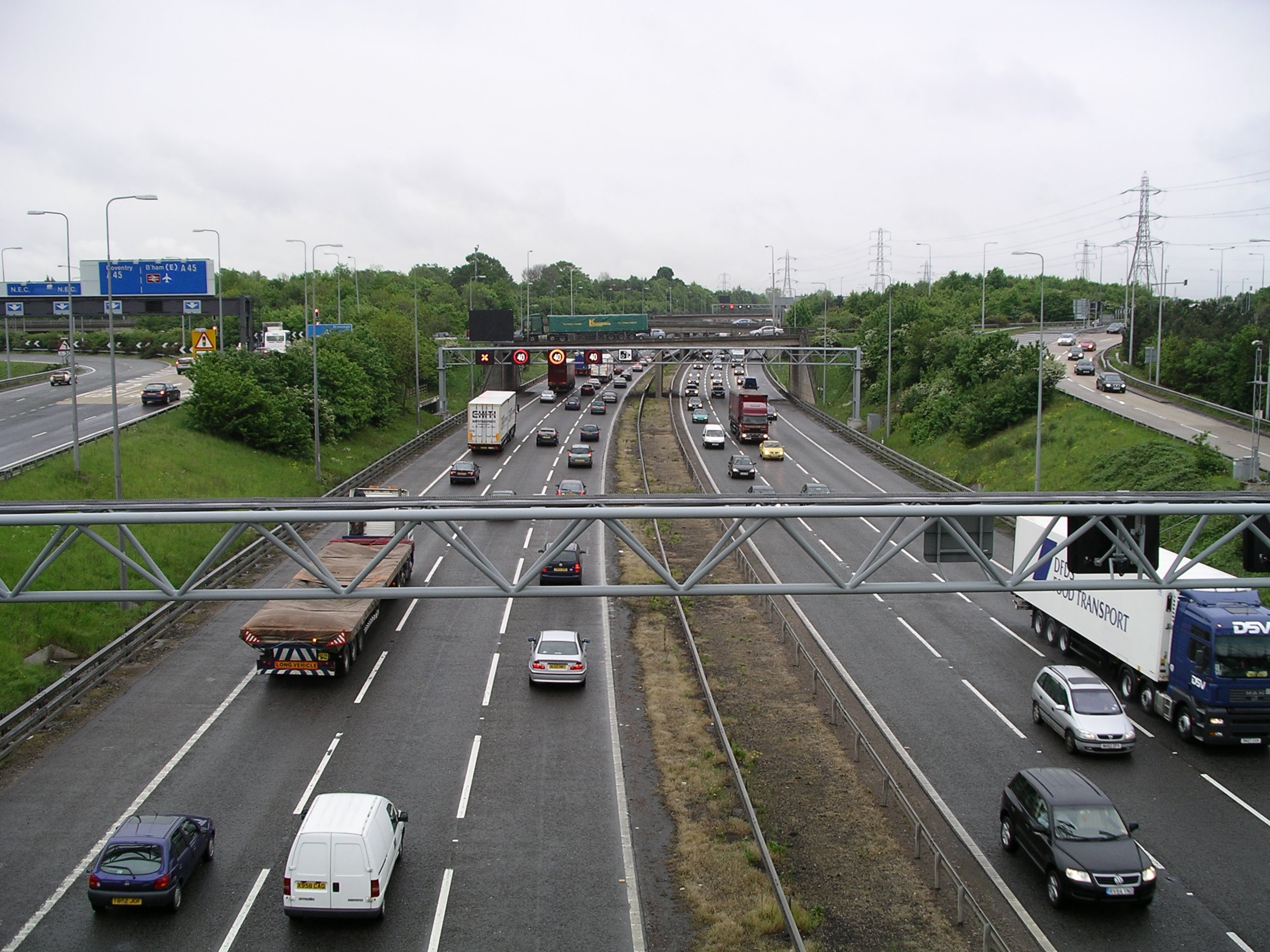
The gantries over the M42 motorway in the United Kingdom show the variable speed limit in operation.

Active traffic management is a method of increasing peak capacity and smoothing traffic flows on busy major highways. Techniques include dynamic speed limits, managed lanes, variable-message signs, and ramp-metering. It has been implemented in several countries, including Germany, the United Kingdom, Canada and the United States.

== United Kingdom ==
It is currently in operation on the M42 motorway south-east of Birmingham and in Warwickshire. The scheme had initially been criticised by some due to possible safety and environmental concerns, however a Highways Agency report into the first six months of the scheme showed a reduction in the number of accidents from over 5 a month to 1.5 per month on average. it has now been expanded onto other roads following the initial evaluation on the M42. It is seen as a less expensive alternative to road widening.

=== Technology ===
The section of road subject to ATM is monitored by MIDAS sensor loops placed in the road every 100 metres (328 ft) (which is closer than normal) to observe traffic flows. A computerised system monitors the traffic flows and can set the best speed limit for the current flow of traffic and switch on speed limit signs mounted on gantries up to 2 kilometres (1.24 mi) before an incident. Operators can also monitor 150 CCTV cameras along the route and can control both the speed limits and information signs. Overhead variable message signs can direct drivers to use the hard shoulder during busy periods.

When the speed limit has been lowered to 60 miles per hour (97 km/h) or below the hard shoulder can be opened as an additional lane. To facilitate this and still maintain safety a series of refuge areas have been created around every 500 metres (1,640 ft) along that stretch of the road. These take the form of lay bys to the side of the hard shoulder and contain SOS phones within them. In the event of a vehicle breaking down on the hard shoulder, operators can close it, or they can close a lane to allow emergency services access to an accident. The hard shoulder is never opened on the sections under a junction between the off and on slip roads. Close to junctions use of the hard shoulder as a lane is restricted to traffic exiting or entering at that junction.

ATM involves converting the hard shoulder into a normal lane during periods of high traffic flow to expand the capacity of the road and may reduce the need to widen motorways. Similar schemes have already been implemented in Europe.

The system makes use of Automatic Number Plate Recognition cameras which to monitor traffic flows and tailor the system. Digital enforcement cameras are also mounted on the gantries and are operated by the West Midlands Police to enforce the mandatory variable speed limits.

==== Future implementation ====
- Vehicular Ad-Hoc Network
- Intelligent Traffic-light Management

== In Canada ==
While active traffic management is currently limited in Canada, more implementation is expected to occur in the future. The QEW highway near Toronto utilizes ramp metering for a portion of the roadway on-ramps.

The city of Toronto has also implemented traffic signal re-timing (signal optimization). Approximately 22 intersections in Toronto now have adaptive signals.

In the province of British Columbia, variable speed limits on overhead gantries have been in use since 2019 on a few highways.

== In the United States ==
A number of highways in the United States have variable message signs and variable speed limits. The New Jersey Turnpike has been using active signage since the 1960s, though systems have evolved over time as they have been deployed in other areas of the country. A modern implementation of active traffic management was activated in 2010 using IRIS on Interstate 35W in Minneapolis, Minnesota and its southern suburbs as part of the Urban Partnership Agreement. Active lane management on I-35W was later combined with high-occupancy toll lanes and eventually joined by a bus rapid transitway. An ATM scheme was deployed on 10 August 2010 in Washington.

=== In Washington State ===
The Washington State Department of Transportation (WSDOT) has completed Active Traffic Management schemes on several motorways in the Seattle metropolitan area. It is the first legally enforceable system in the United States. Failure to comply with speed limits and overhead instructions are citable offences.

ATM systems were activated on 11.6 km (7.2 mi) of the I-5 northbound carriageway in August 2010. In November 2010, ATM was expanded to 12.4 km (7.7 mi) of the SR 520 in both directions. In March 2011, ATM completed testing and began operations on 14.3 km (8.9 mi) of the I-90 in both directions.

The ATM schemes build upon WSDOT's existing arsenal of Intelligent Transport Systems (ITS) which is supported by traffic sensor loops embedded in the pavement approximately every 800 m (2640 ft) apart. On motorway sections with ATM, gantries are also spaced roughly 800 m (2640 ft) apart. The primary ATM strategies used by WSDOT is ramp metering, queue protection, hard shoulder running, junction control, and lane-specific signalling. Motorway operations in the Seattle area are conducted in the Northwest Region Traffic Management Centre in Shoreline, just north of Seattle.

==== Ramp metering ====
WSDOT's ramp metering strategy is aimed at reducing the volume of traffic entering the motorway and has been in operation since the early 1980s. Traffic signals are operated part-time on slip roads, which are used to temporarily store traffic. The queuing traffic is then released onto the motorway one vehicle per signal cycle.

Unlike other states in the U.S., WSDOT does not have a time-of-day schedule for metering, nor does it have a rigid meter rate as it is considered too inflexible. Dedicated operators monitor traffic conditions visually through CCTV and switch the meters on and off manually. Once turned on, the meter rate is automatically determined and updated every 20 seconds using a local traffic-responsive algorithm based on fuzzy logic. The algorithm, named the Fuzzy Logic Ramp Metering algorithm, is the successor to the Bottleneck Algorithm.

The length of the queue on the slip road and the mainline occupancy immediately surrounding the slip road are fed as inputs to the algorithm, which determines a meter rate that allows as few vehicles to join the motorway mainline as possible without overflowing queuing vehicles onto nearby arterial streets. During its operation, ramp metering is fully automated. Operators will manually tune the ramp meters if necessary. They also have the ability to intervene when a malfunction occurs.

The performance of Fuzzy Logic Ramp Metering is comparable to the ALINEA algorithm used by several European agencies.

==== Queue protection ====
Variable speed limits displayed on overhead lane control signs (LCS) above each lane are used to reduce traffic speed prior to a congestion point. Variable message signs (VMS) accompany the reduced speed limit to warn drivers of slow traffic. Speeds are determined automatically and are lowered using one or two upstream gantries depending on the size of the reduction. Intervals of 8.0 km/h (5.0 mph) and 16.1 km/h (10.0 mph) are common. Upon the end of a congestion point, speed limits are returned to the default speed. The primary purpose of queue protection is to reduce rear-end collisions.

==== Hard shoulder running and junction control ====
As part of the SR 520 Bridge Replacement and HOV scheme, WSDOT plans to implement junction control through hard shoulder running. Based on traffic conditions, ATM will open the shoulder as an auxiliary lane on the SR 520 westbound carriageway across Portage Bay Bridge, which will turn the motorway section from a 3 + 2 to a 3 + 3 dual carriageway. The additional capacity will allow traffic from the Montlake Boulevard junction more room to merge. The shoulder running can also be activated for incident management. A similar scheme is being developed for the I-5 northbound carriageway in Marysville.

==== Lane specific signalling ====
In the event of a lane closure due to a collision or roadwork, LCS signs will display a red X above the closed lane at the location of the incident. The gantry immediately upstream will direct motorists to merge into adjacent lanes. Drivers are allowed approximately 800 m (2640 ft), or one gantry interval, to clear the lane. Lane closures are done manually through operator intervention. Operators also have the ability to override HOV designation above HOV lanes, opening it to regular traffic if necessary.

==== Implications ====
Although WSDOT has not published data on the performance of the ATM implementation, low compliance with variable speed limits and overhead instructions is noticeable among Washington drivers. Part of the challenge is allowing drivers more time to adapt to the system, while the other part is poor enforcement from the Washington State Patrol and the absence of automated enforcement such as those used in England.

== See also ==
- Smart motorway
- Traffic optimization
- Lane control lights
- Tidal flow (traffic)
