= Lane control =

Lane control may refer to:

- Reversible lane, a lane in which traffic may travel in either direction
- Lane control lights, a type of traffic light used to manage traffic, as for a reversible lane
- Lane control (cycling), a vehicular cycling practice
