= Maryland State Highway Administration =

Government highway agency of the State of Maryland

Agency overview
- Formed: 1908; 118 years ago (as State Roads Commission)
- Jurisdiction: Maryland
- Headquarters: "707 Building", 707 North Calvert Street, Baltimore, Maryland, U.S. 21202
- Agency executive: William Pines, Administrator
- Parent agency: Maryland Department of Transportation
- Website: roads.maryland.gov

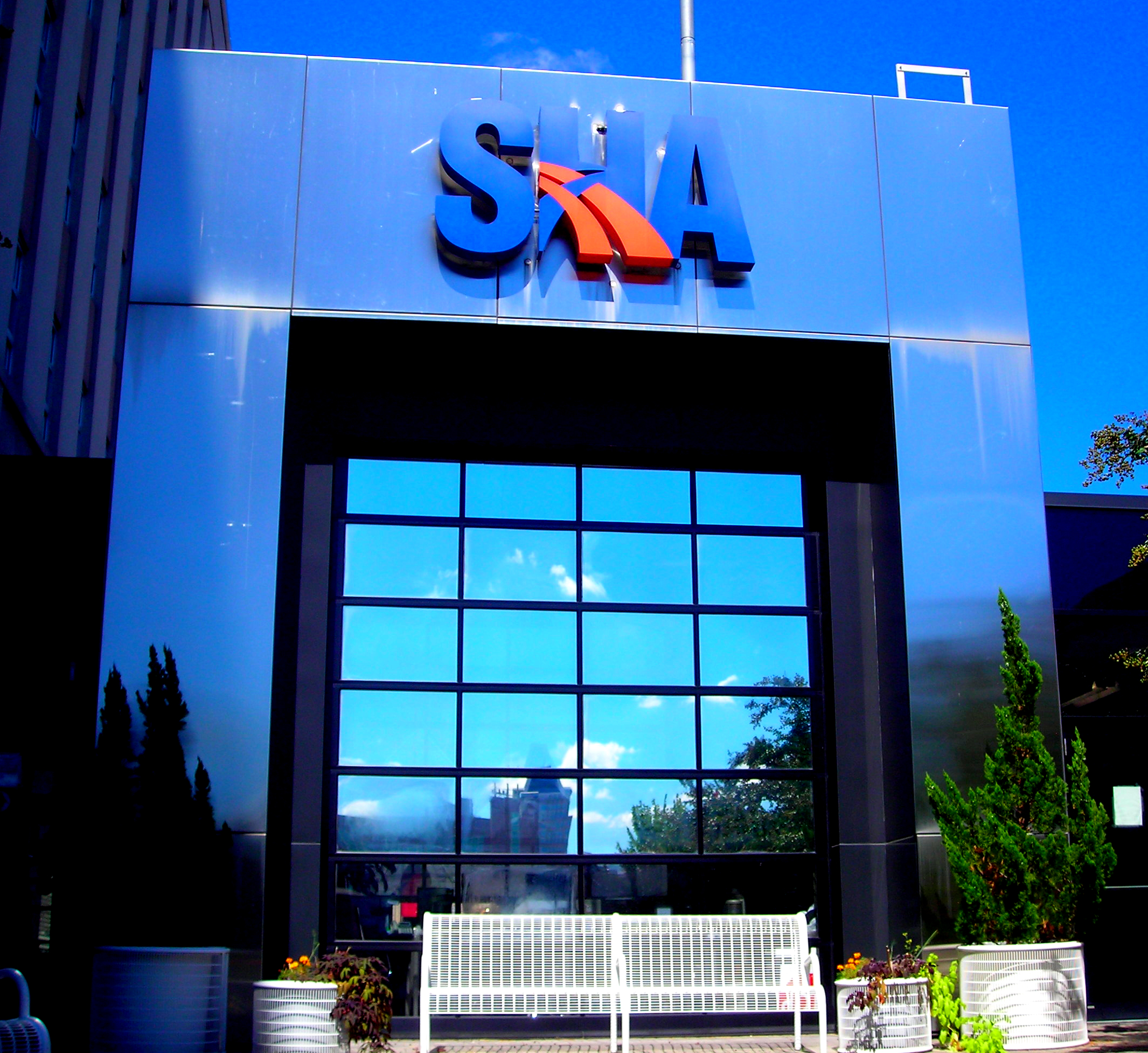
Agency headquarters in Baltimore

The Maryland State Highway Administration (MDSHA, MDOT SHA, or simply SHA) is the state agency responsible for maintaining Maryland's numbered highways outside Baltimore. Formed originally under authority of the General Assembly of Maryland in 1908 as the State Roads Commission (SRC), under the direction of the executive branch of state government headed by the governor of Maryland, it is tasked with maintaining non-tolled/free bridges throughout the state, removing snow from the state's major thoroughfares, administering the state's "adopt-a-highway" program, and both developing and maintaining the state's freeway/expressway system. There was a reorganization of the several commissions, bureaus, boards, and assorted minor agencies with departments of the executive branch and establishment of the governor's cabinet in the early 1970s following the adoption of several individual reorganization recommendations after the rejection by the voters in a November 1968 referendum of the 1968 proposed overall new state constitution prepared by the 1967–1968 Constitutional Convention. SHA is now a division of the larger establishment of the Maryland Department of Transportation and is currently overseen by an administrator.

MDOT SHA headquarters is located in the city of Baltimore and houses numerous divisions and offices, including:

- Office of Planning and Preliminary Engineering
- Office of Highway Development
- Office of Structures
- Office of Environmental Design
- Office of Policy and Research
- Office of Real Estate

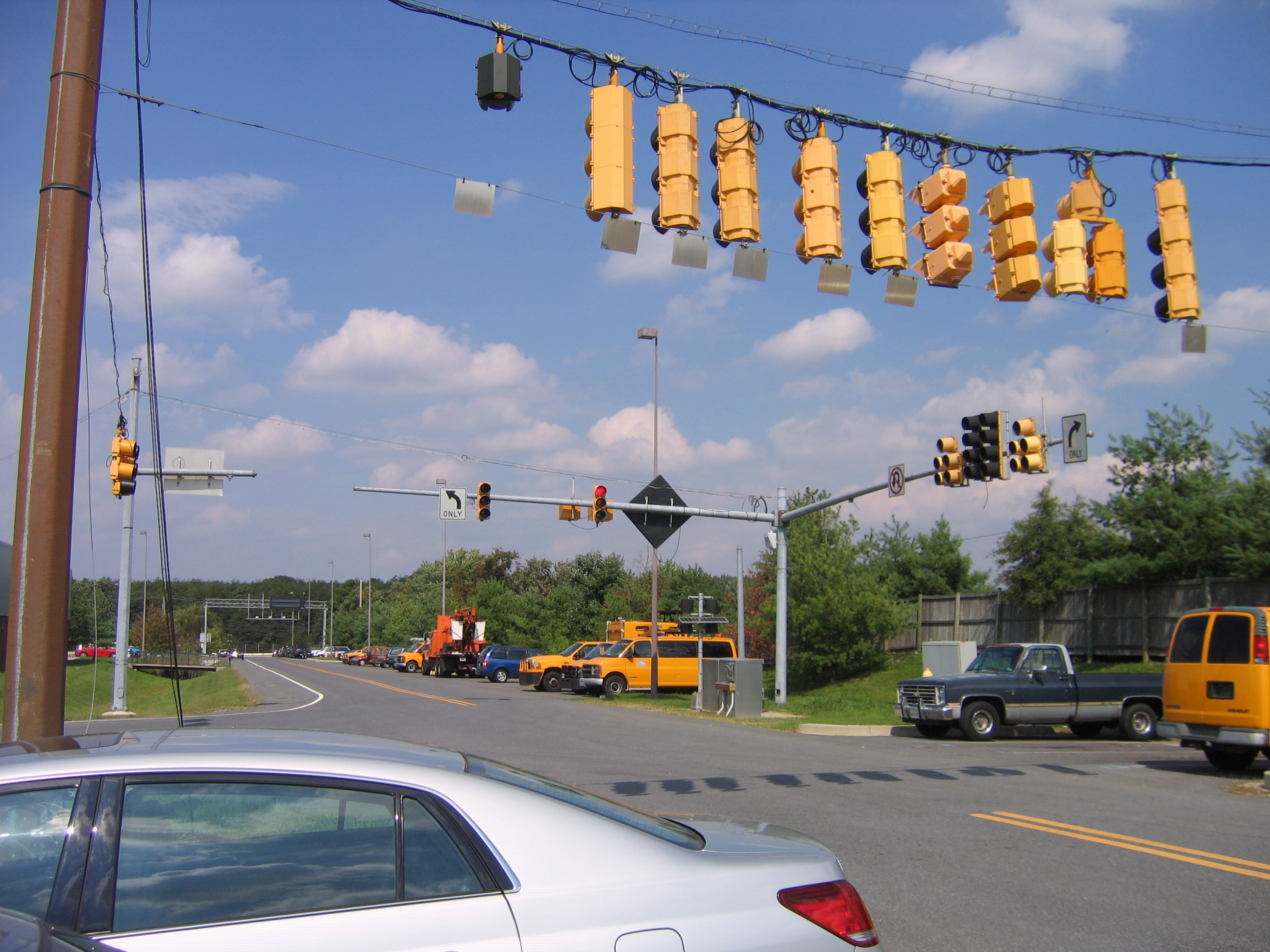
Signal testing at the Office of Traffic and Safety

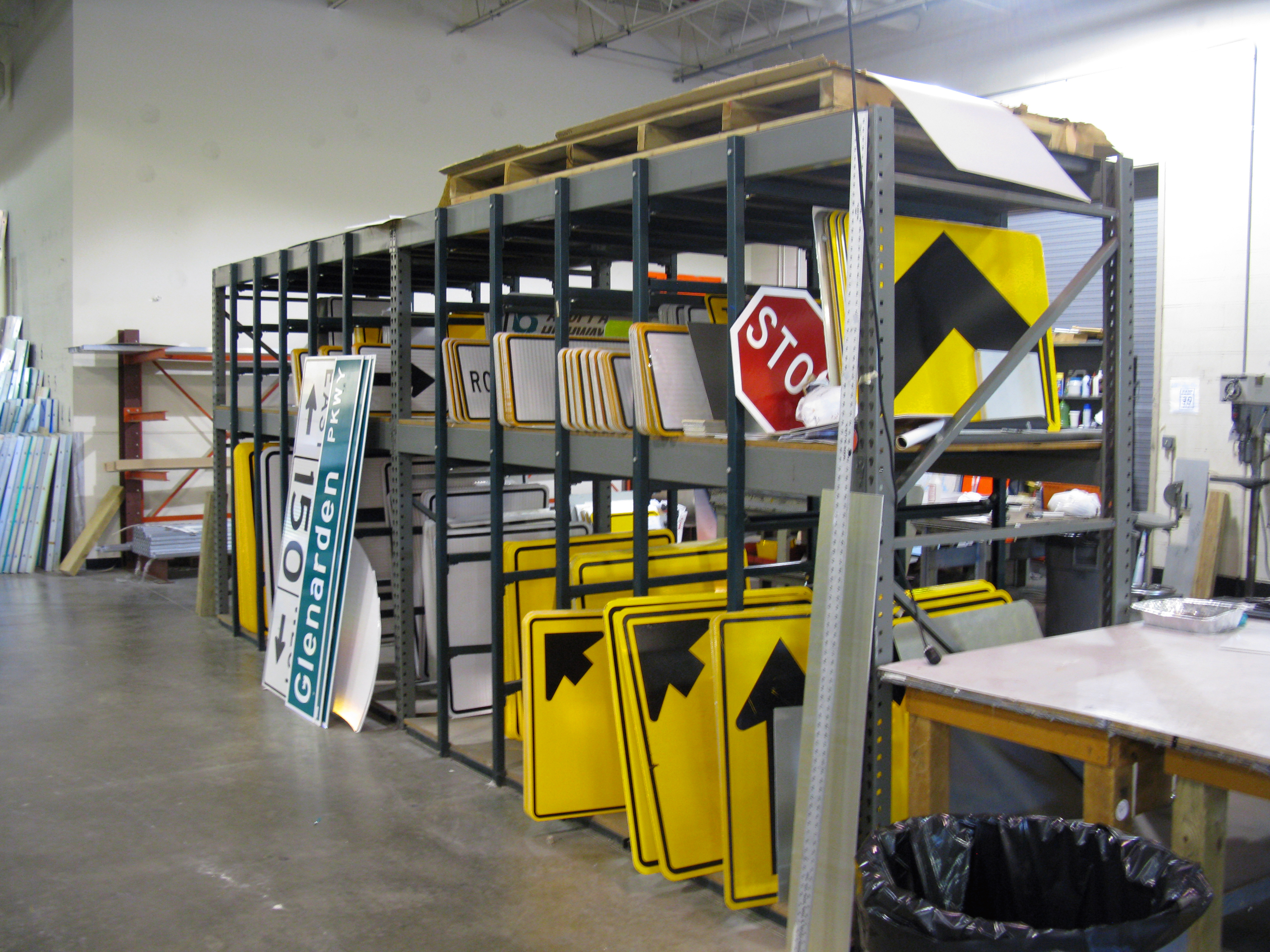
MDOT SHA sign shop

MDOT SHA also maintains a complex in Hanover, which is home to:

- Office of Construction
- Office of Traffic and Safety (OOTS), which includes the Traffic Engineering Design Division, which is responsible for the development of new traffic signals, signal modifications, upgrades, and signal phasing; the Signal Operations Section, which provides personnel and equipment for the maintenance and programming of signals along state roadways in every county except Montgomery County.; and the Sign Operations Section, which designs and fabricates signing for use throughout the entire state.
- Office of Maintenance, which provides assistance with recurring maintenance tasks that require more intensive study—particularly roadway safety and resurfacing projects.
- Office of Transportation Mobility and Operations (OTMO), which uses intelligent transportation systems (ITSs) technologies, Advanced Traffic Management Systems (ATMSs), and partnerships to monitor traffic, clear incidents, assist stranded motorists on our highways, and provide real-time traveler information. Its units include:
  - The Statewide Operations Center is responsible for requesting incident response teams for incidents on state roadways. Responders may include police, fire, medical, the Coordinated Highways Action Response Team (CHART), hazmat, the Maryland Emergency Management Agency (MEMA), environmental, or maintenance teams. This facility is also equipped to operate as a Statewide Transportation Emergency Operations Center.
  - Office of CHART, which provides incident response services throughout the state, though it only provides regular patrols on interstates and select major arterials.
- The Office of Materials Technology (OMT) which consists of the Executive Services area and eight divisions: Field Explorations, Engineering Geology, Pavement and Geotechnical, Asphalt Technology, Concrete Technology, Soils and Aggregate Technology, Structural Materials and Pavement Markings, and Materials Management. All are crucial in the maintenance of current roadways as well as the development of new ones.

== Districts ==
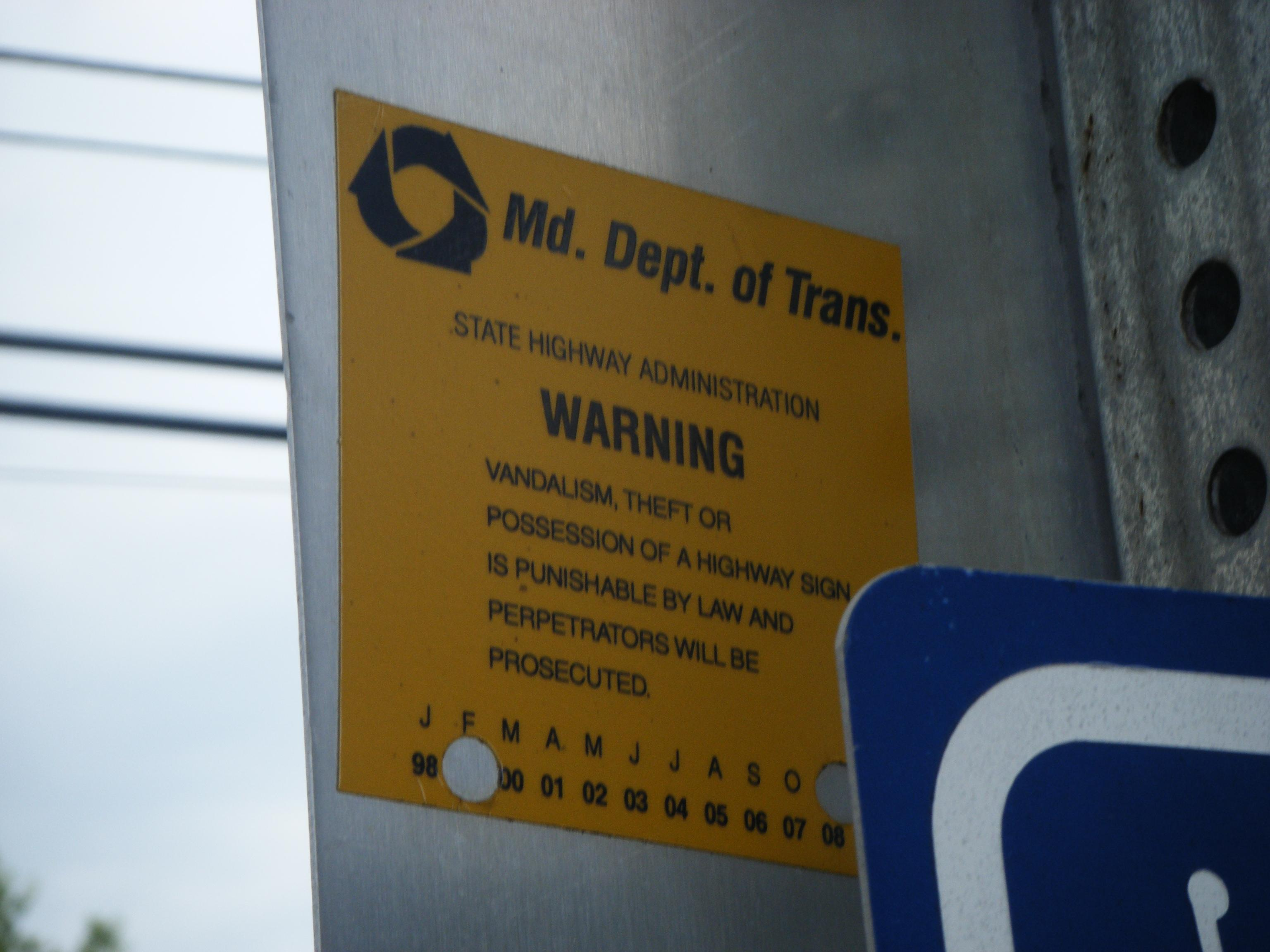
MDSHA sign sticker.

There are seven districts in the state. These districts at the least, have divisions for traffic, construction, maintenance, and utilities. Each district also oversees several maintenance shops—typically one per county. The following is a table of the districts, counties within their jurisdiction, and their respective headquarters.

District	Counties	Headquarters
	Wicomico County Worcester County; Somerset County; Dorchester County	Salisbury
	Cecil County Kent County; Queen Anne's County; Talbot County; Caroline County	Chestertown
	Montgomery County Prince George's County	Greenbelt
	Baltimore County Harford County	Cockeysville
	Anne Arundel County Calvert County; Charles County; St. Mary's County	Annapolis
	Washington County Allegany County; Garrett County	La Vale
	Frederick County Howard County; Carroll County	Frederick
