= Freeway service patrol =

American traffic control program

A freeway service patrol (also known as a motorist assistance patrol, roadway service patrol, safety service patrol, highway assistance patrol, or courtesy patrol) is a publicly funded program in the United States operated by state or local transportation agencies or highway patrols to reduce traffic congestion and improve roadway safety. These programs deploy specially equipped and marked vehicles that patrol designated highway routes to assist with disabled vehicles—either by restoring them to working condition or towing them to a safe location—as well as to remove minor roadway hazards and support traffic incident management operations.

Program names vary by jurisdiction. Some states use a generic term, such as the Freeway Service Patrol in California, while others adopt region-specific branding, such as Indiana's Hoosier Helper or Georgia's HERO program. Freeway service patrols are often integrated with intelligent transportation systems (ITS) and are classified as market package EM04 in the United States Department of Transportation’s National ITS Architecture, reflecting their role in emergency response and traffic incident management.

== History ==
The first regularly operating freeway service patrol in the United States began in 1960 in Chicago, Illinois. A 1998 study by the Texas Transportation Institute found that approximately 64% of the 54 surveyed programs had been established after 1990.

== Operations ==
Despite freeway service patrols' inclusion in the National ITS Architecture, and their increasingly widespread use, there has been no national standardization as to how they are operated.

The structure and coverage of freeway service patrols vary by jurisdiction. Some operate only during weekday peak periods, while others offer 24/7 coverage.

Programs utilize a fleet of roving vehicles designed to keep traffic flowing by either restoring disabled vehicles to working order or towing them off the freeway to designated safe locations. Vehicles may include tow trucks or other specially equipped vehicles including light-duty pickup trucks or minivans, and are typically marked for branding, visibility and safety.

Most freeway service patrols programs offer "quick fix" services to repair a disabled vehicle such as changing a flat tire, jump-starting a vehicle, refilling radiators, taping leaking hoses, or providing a small amount of fuel. If on-site repairs are not possible, the vehicle may be moved to a nearby off-freeway location. Patrol operators also assist law enforcement with removing stalled vehicles and debris from travel lanes to prevent secondary crashes.

Program administration varies. Some, such as California's Freeway Service Patrol, contract services to private operators. Others, such as Georgia's HERO program, are operated directly by government agencies with state-owned vehicles and staffed by Georgia Department of Transportation employees.

== Purpose ==
The variation in freeway service patrol operating characteristics may be considered an example of form follows function, reflecting the relative importance each program assigns to such goals as motorist assistance, incident management, and traffic control. In general, though, the purpose of a freeway service patrol is to use rapid response to reduce traffic congestion. Like many ITS technologies, they are considered a much more cost-effective method to do that than highway construction, especially in metropolitan areas where land for highway expansion is either unavailable or prohibitively expensive. Using such methods as assigning a dollar value to drivers' time and to the exhaust emissions of vehicles stuck in traffic, studies through the early and mid 1990s estimated the benefit-cost ratio for some freeway service patrols may be as high as 36.2:1. Freeway service patrols are also seen as a way to develop goodwill towards the community in which they operate and the government responsible for them.

== Opposition ==
Although motorist surveys reveal that programs, once in place, are extremely popular with the general public, proposed freeway service patrols have met opposition from various groups. Most recently, a proposed freeway service patrol in Hawaii has been placed on hiatus due to objections from a private tow truck company. The towing and recovery industry has been the source of opposition to previous proposals for freeway service patrols, as have small-government advocates.
