= Tollbooth =

Booth at a tollgate where a toll collector collects tolls

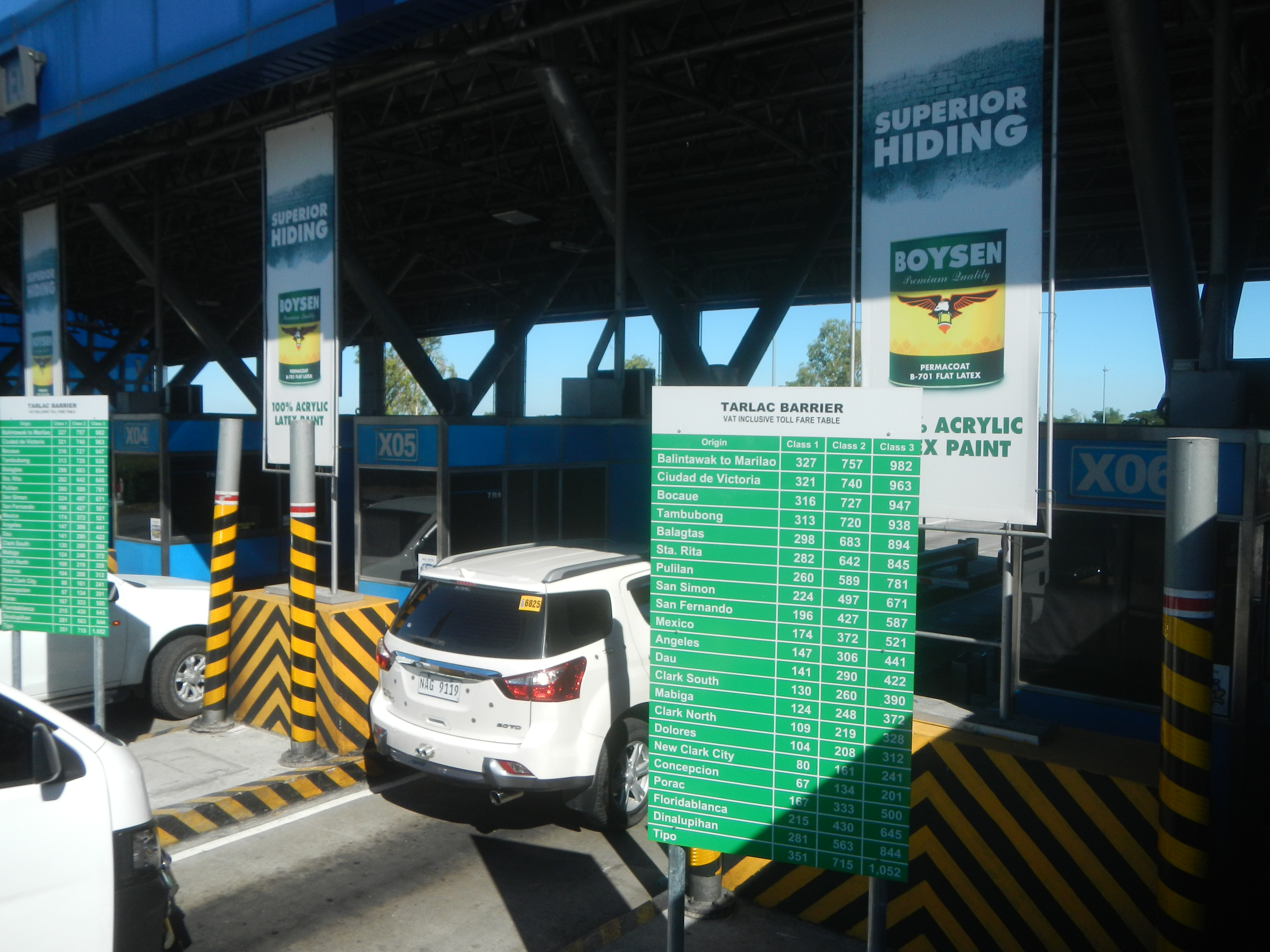
A car stopping at a tollbooth on the Subic–Clark–Tarlac Expressway in the Philippines

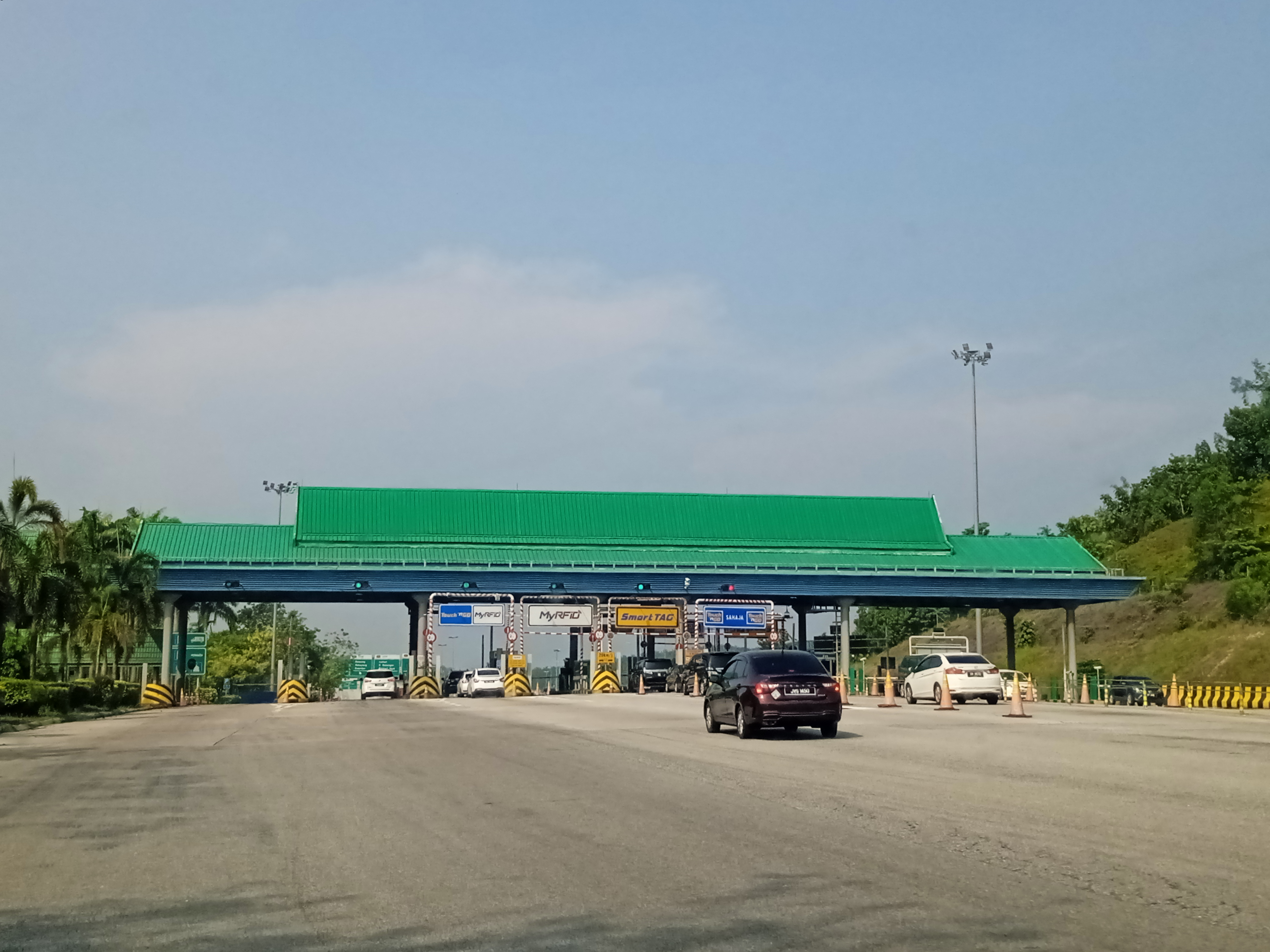
Tollbooth in Selangor, Malaysia.

A tollbooth (or toll booth) is an enclosure placed along a toll road that is used for the purpose of collecting a toll from passing traffic. A structure consisting of several tollbooths placed next to each other is called a toll plaza, tollgate, or toll station. They have historically been staffed by transportation agents who manually collect the toll, but, in the modern day, many have been replaced with automatic electronic toll collection systems, such as E-ZPass in the Eastern United States.

== Replacement ==
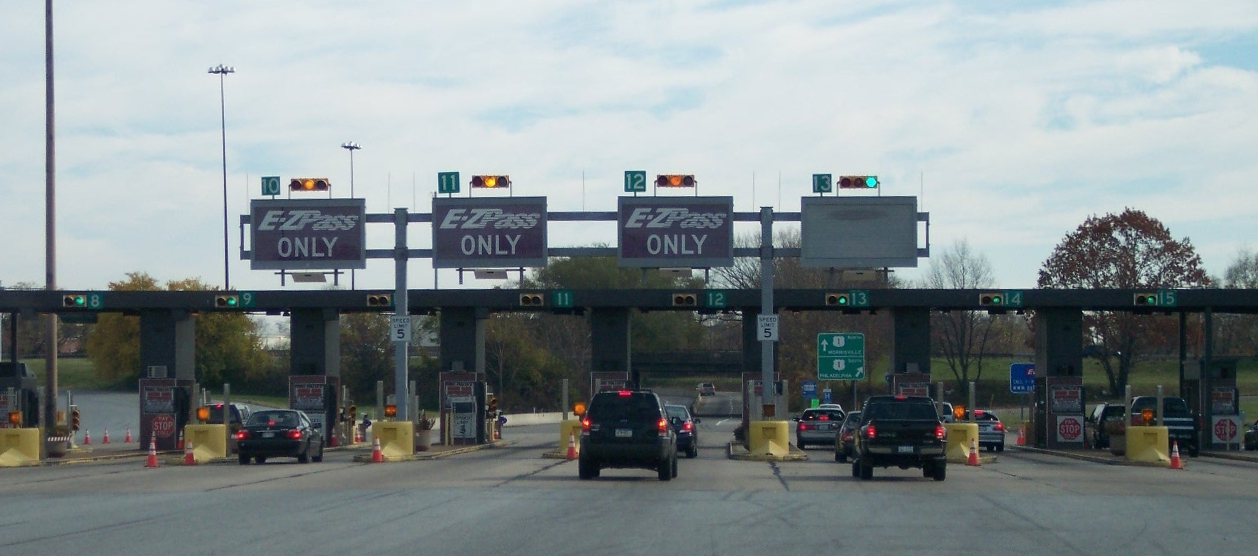
Toll plaza on the Pennsylvania Turnpike before conversion to all-electronic tolling

In the 21st century, electronic toll collection (ETC) has replaced many former locations of tollbooths around the world. ETC is an automated system that allows drivers to pay tolls without stopping. Benefits of automatic toll collection include reducing air pollution and fuel consumption, and saving motorists time and money compared to traditional tollbooths.

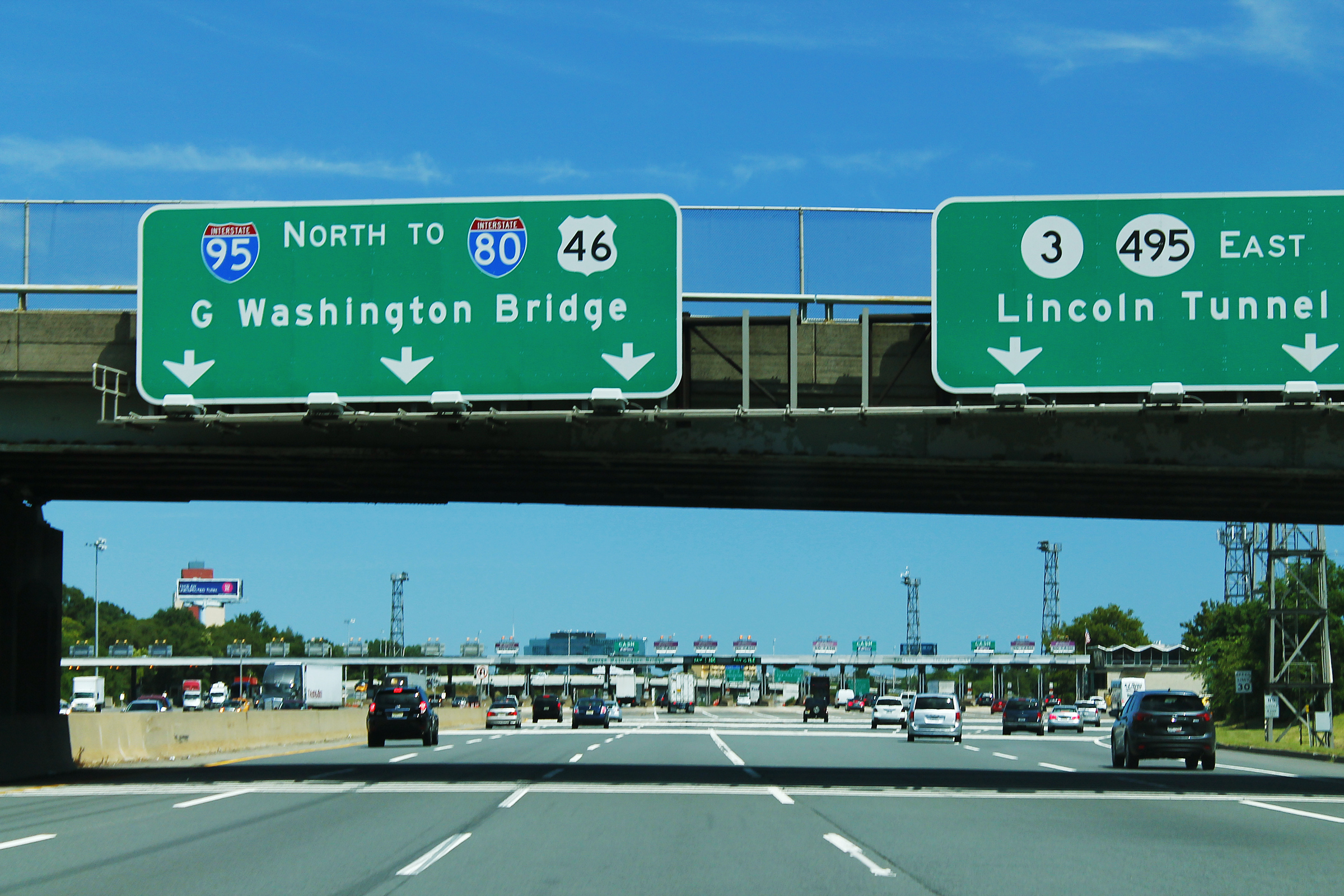
Some tollbooths have been widened with the addition of toll gates to accommodate increasing automobile traffic, such as this one on the New Jersey Turnpike.

The COVID-19 pandemic led to further losses of tollbooths, causing the U.S. state of Maryland to accelerate its shift towards all-electronic tolling by eliminating all cash payments from toll facilities. Similarly, the Pennsylvania Turnpike accelerated its plan to move to all-electronic tolling. While tollbooths are currently still in place throughout the turnpike system, signs inform drivers to keep moving through toll plaza, "we bill you".

== See also ==
- Electronic toll collection
- Lane control lights
- Open road tolling
- Traffic light
- Tollhouse
- Toll plaza
- Toll road
