= Georgia Navigator =

Georgia Navigator (sometimes also as Georgia NaviGAtor) is an Advanced Traffic Management System used in the U.S. state of Georgia. It is operated by the Georgia Department of Transportation (GDOT), and was first activated in April 1996, just before the 1996 Summer Olympics in Atlanta.

== Metro Atlanta ==
Most of the Georgia Navigator system is installed in metro Atlanta, where at least half of the state's population lives. It includes traffic cameras, changeable message signs, ramp meters, and a traffic speed sensor system. Unlike other ITS deployments around the world, Georgia Navigator almost exclusively uses video detection cameras to gather traffic flow data, as opposed to traditional sensors embedded in the pavement. Additionally, a portion of the system (Georgia 400 and parts of I-16, I-75 and I-85 outside of Atlanta) receives traffic flow information from floating car data gathered by anonymously tracking cell phones. All devices are connected by buried optical fiber, which in turn links to GDOT's command center at its Transportation Management Center (TMC) in Atlanta.

== Beyond Atlanta ==
Outside of Atlanta, Georgia Navigator components were installed on Interstate 475 near Macon during its expansion from four lanes to six lanes. The Macon system is connected to the Atlanta TMC via fiber, allowing communication between the two centers. Georgia Navigator also has weather stations with pavement sensors mainly in the mountain and coastal areas of Georgia. Traffic sensors are installed on official evacuation routes, but are only activated during a hurricane approaching the Georgia coast or eastern Florida panhandle.

== Distribution of information ==
Information from the system is distributed to the public through a variety of outlets. GDOT administers two of its own websites (a standard version and a customizable "My Navigator" version), and operates a 511 telephone information service. Additionally, Navigator data is used by several other companies, who typically enhance and package the data for sale to various media outlets or private websites. An example of a third-party use of Navigator data is The Weather Channel, which shows current traffic conditions (provided by Traffic Pulse) during the local forecast portion of its broadcast.

== Deployment progress ==
Georgia Navigator is in the midst of a large expansion program. The system covers nearly all of the Perimeter (Interstate 285) highway around Atlanta, and all Interstates within and several miles beyond it. It also covers the freeway portions of Peachtree Industrial Boulevard (SR 141) and Langford Parkway (SR 166), as well as Georgia 400 from I-285 to the Alpharetta area. As of May 2009, work on I-285 is nearing completion on the south side from I-85 east to I-75. Other expansion projects underway include US 78, GA 400 inside I-285, and I-85 in the Union City / Peachtree City area. By late 2009, nearly all freeways in metro Atlanta will have full Navigator coverage.

Several ramp meters began operation in 2008 and 2009 in metro Atlanta. Some of the first corridors to be metered were I-285, I-85 in Gwinnett County, I-75 in Cobb County, and I-575. Unlike early systems which used induction loops, the new meters will employ video detection cameras to sense the density of traffic and allow an optimized rate of vehicles to proceed onto the freeway.

On local roads, Navigator includes cameras and signs that are operated by local county and city governments, though coverage is not nearly as dense as the freeway portion of the system. The local road devices also feed into the Georgia Navigator system and are controlled by a common software platform. Traffic light operation is not currently part of the system, but work to integrate the signals into Navigator is underway.
