= Highway Emergency Response Operators =

American freeway patrol service

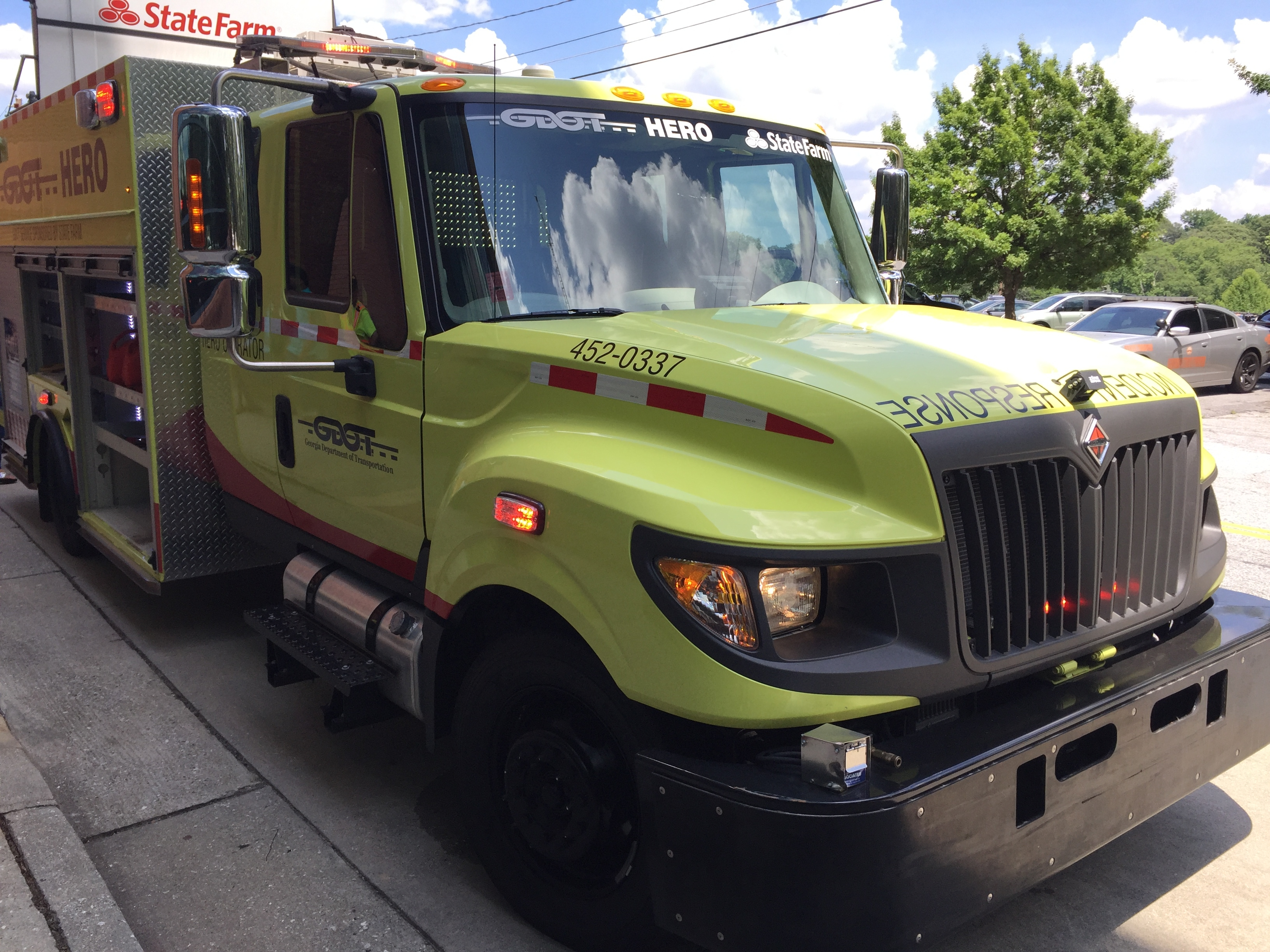
A HERO truck

A Highway Emergency Response Operators (HERO) program is a type of freeway service patrol in United States.

The first program started with the Georgia Department of Transportation (GDOT) in 1994. It has expanded to states like Texas, with similar programs in Florida and New York (state). Both the programs and the individual vehicles are typically referred to by the acronym HERO.

== History ==
The program began in Atlanta in 1994 as the city prepared for the 1996 Olympics and has since been expanded with GDOT's 511 Navigator Intelligent Transportation System program.

While previously being sponsored by State Farm which began in 2009, funding for the HERO program has been provided by Congestion Mitigation/Air Quality (CMAQ) Fund under the guidance of the Atlanta Regional Commission's (ARC) Incident Management Taskforce. The Taskforce members include the Federal Highway Administration (FHWA), GDOT, traffic reporters, emergency and first-response agencies and the private sector.

In February 2017, GDOT expanded it to east Georgia with the Coordinated Highway Assistance & Maintenance Program (CHAMP), which performs all of the HERO functions, in addition to monitoring for any maintenance needs along rural state roads. It began at first by covering I-20 east from metro Atlanta to the state line including I-520 around Augusta, and the middle of I-16 around Dublin. The CHAMP program expanded statewide in May 2017.

== Georgia ==
The state of Georgia operates the HERO program as part of GDOT's Office of Traffic Operations. The HERO unit's primary purpose is to minimize traffic congestion by clearing wrecked or disabled vehicles from the travel lanes and providing traffic control at incident scenes. As a secondary service, HERO operates as a service patrol; assisting stranded motorists who have a flat tire, are out of fuel, or are stranded by a mechanical failure of their vehicle. In addition to their normal patrol duties in metro Atlanta, HERO is deployed to assist with traffic control at the Masters Tournament in Augusta, Georgia and along Interstates 16, 75, and 95 during hurricane evacuations.

HERO Operators are GDOT employees, distinguishing the program from freeway service patrols in other states, such as California, which are operated under contract by private tow truck companies. The HERO day is split into four shifts: Alpha (morning), Bravo (afternoon), Charlie (weekend) and Delta (overnight). HERO operates 24 hours a day, seven days a week. Typically, HERO and CHAMP Operators work between 75,000 and 80,000 incidents per year.

In Georgia, motorists needing HERO or CHAMP assistance dial 511 (and press 1) to reach the Traffic Management Center, GDOT's primary center for incident management. 511 is also the number for general traffic information throughout the state of Georgia.

=== Expansion ===
Under Georgia Governor Sonny Perdue's Fast Forward Congestion Relief program, the HERO program was expanded. Before the 2005 expansion, the HERO program consisted of 48 operators; in May 2009 there were nearly 90 positions in the program, 2015 there were 110 operators. This expansion as well as several others since added new routes to the HERO coverage area. As of 2015, GDOT's fleet of 90 HERO trucks cover over 420 miles of roads.

=== Towing and Recovery Incentive Program (TRIP) ===
The HERO units also oversee the TRIP program which now requires an accident to be cleared enough to have traffic significantly improved in 90 minutes from the time that the towing company arrives on scene and is given notice to proceed. (must be on scene in 30 (peak) to 45 (non-peak) minutes or less) Most towing companies pass this requirement because of assistance from GDOT in getting to the scene. Towing companies in the TRIP program must meet a minimum set of standards and pass inspections by GDOT. The approved equipment is issued a TRIP certification sticker.

== Texas ==
In Texas, the program began in 2010, and is generally operated and funded by local Texas Department of Transportation districts and other local area organizations. Initially managed by the Central Texas Mobility Authority, it has been managed by TxDOT since 2017.

=== Service Areas ===
Texas HERO's operate in the Austin, Texas area (covering the Capital Area Metropolitan Planning Organization service area), El Paso (covering the El Paso County, Texas sections of Interstate 10, Texas State Highway Loop 375 and U.S. Route 54) and San Antonio greater area (including but not limited to Interstate 35, Interstate 10, Interstate 410 and Interstate 37).

=== Acknowledgement Program ===
Launched in 2024, TxDOT's Acknowledgement Program allows for companies or organizations outside TxDOT to donate to Safety Service Patrols. In exchange, donors can be acknowledged for their donations by having their name, logo or image placed on the back of a Safety Service Patrol truck.

== Other Similar Programs ==
=== Florida - Road Ranger Service Patrol ===
In Florida, the Florida Department of Transportation, operates the Road Ranger Service Patrol (aka Road Ranger's) program. Operating since 2000, its mission "is to provide free highway assistance services during incidents to reduce delay and improve safety for the motoring public and responders". Approximately, it helps more than 4,000 motorists every month who need minor breakdown assistance.

=== New York - Highway Emergency Local Patrol (HELP) ===
In New York (state), the New York Department of Transportation operates the Highway Emergency Local Patrol (HELP) program since 1994. It is a free service that operates during peak commuter hours during the regular work week. Patrols are provided by NYSDOT staff, through contracts with local private vendors.

== Fleets ==
HERO fleets mostly consist of the Ford F450 utility box configuration as their primary patrol vehicle, International Rescue Trucks, and Ford F250 and Ford Expedition as supervisor vehicles. In Georgia, they painted in bright green and in Texas they are painted white and light blue. Some HERO trucks can pull a fully loaded tractor trailer out of the travel lanes. Inside the trucks, there are enough supplies to handle incidents from accidents, spills, and debris to the tools to get motorists back on the road.

In 2017, GDOT began upgrading the fleet to the Ford F550 in both the traditional enclosed utility box design and a new utility half-box design while phasing out the older Diesel F450's.

== Line of Duty Deaths ==
Since HERO was established in 1994, two operators have been killed in the line of duty.

=== Georgia ===
Spencer Pass was struck and killed in January 2011 while jumping a stalled car on Interstate 85 in South Atlanta. In 2016, the overpass at I-85 and Cleveland Ave was renamed in his honor.

Moses King was killed in August 2015 when he was struck by an impaired driver that crashed into him on Atlanta's I-75/I-85 while providing traffic control for an earlier accident scene. The driver was arrested at the scene.
