= Urban Traffic Management and Control =

The Urban Traffic Management Control or UTMC programme is the main initiative in the United Kingdom for the development of a more open approach to Intelligent Transport Systems or ITS in urban areas. Originating as a Government research programme, the initiative is now managed by a community forum, the UTMC Development Group, which represents both local transport authorities and the systems industry.

UTMC systems are designed to allow the different applications used within modern traffic management systems to communicate and share information with each other. This allows previously disparate data from multiple sources such as Automatic Number Plate Recognition (ANPR) cameras, Variable Message Signs (VMS), car parks, traffic signals, air quality monitoring stations and meteorological data, to be amalgamated into a central console or database. The idea behind UTMC is to maximise road network potential to create a more robust and intelligent system that can be used to meet current and future management requirements.

== Background and history ==
The UTMC was launched in 1997 by the UK Government's Department for Environment, Transport and the Regions (now the Department for Transport (DfT)). During the first three years, a number of research projects were undertaken to establish and validate an approach based on modular systems and open standards. These have contributed to the UTMC Technical Specifications, which define UTMC standards.

- To assist local authorities in gaining the most from Intelligent transportation system and to achieve their transport objectives, the Department for Transport initiated the six-year, £6M UTMC programme in 1997. The first half of the UTMC programme (1997–2000) concentrated on specific applied research tasks, on both technical and operational issues.
- In January 2001, the programme embarked on a demonstrator phase to consolidate the results of the earlier research. Full scale demonstrator projects taking a pragmatic UTMC approach were run in Preston with key systems provided by Mott MacDonald, Reading and Stratford-upon-Avon using Siemens and York with systems from Tenet Technology (these systems are now owned and marketed by Dynniq).
- Early in 2003, the UTMC Development Group (UDG) was set up, as a group of local authorities and suppliers, with the support of the DfT, to oversee the future development of UTMC. This has managed the initiative continuously since 2004.

UTMC has helped local authorities achieve their goals by adopting an appropriate, but not over constraining, set of standards to allow users, suppliers and integrators of UTMC systems to plan and supply systems cost-effectively in an open market. These standards are essential in breaking boundaries and local authority borders to allow network interoperability.

== UTMC Activities ==
=== Specifications and Standards ===
The UTMC Specifications and Standards Group (S&SG) is responsible for ensuring that the UTMC technical framework continues to meet local authorities' needs, currently and in the future. The S&SG oversees the maintenance and upkeep of the UTMC Technical Specifications. Its members are drawn from both local authorities and the supplier community, but it is always led by local authorities.

The S&SG works closely with the full range of UTMC suppliers to ensure its requirements are technically achievable. It operates a transparent consultation regime on all technical changes. From time to time it may commission and fund technical research and standards development activities, though it operates principally through coordinating the input freely provided by suppliers and users.

The Specification provides standards for shared data (i.e. data communicated between applications of a UTMC system, or between a UTMC system and an external system) through:

- holding definitions of current UTMC Objects, and making them available to users;
- receiving submissions for potential new UTMC Objects, and coordinating consultation as necessary;
- facilitating contact between Object developers;
- advising on changes needed to potential new UTMC Objects;
- registering new UTMC Objects.

As well as undertaking technical work to develop national specifications, there are a number of activities that help "market" the initiative to the traffic management community. There is a conference, usually held annually, papers and articles are published in key industry journals and regular workshops are held focusing on key (technical or operational) themes. In 2006, the UTMC community ran a number of special sessions at the ITS World Congress held in London, as well as running a village of suppliers demonstrating UTMC-compatible products.

The UTMC initiative formerly published a Products Catalogue, representing products submitted as compliant by suppliers. This was discontinued in December 2014.

== UTMC specification documents ==
The following documents are maintained and published for open use on the UTMC website.

- The UTMC Framework Technical Specification TS003 presents the core technical standards recommended for use by Traffic Managers in their systems.
- The UTMC Objects Registry TS004 presents a standardised set of data structures associated with traffic management, in several forms including UML data model, XML schema, SNMP MIBs, some IDL scripts for CORBA based systems, and tabular representation (originally designed for database designers).

The current issue of the Technical Specification is available for free download on the UTMC resources website .

== Examples of UTMC in action ==
Local authorities with UTMC have more control over their road network. Some examples of what they can do are:

Advise
By monitoring how long it takes a vehicle to pass two ANPR cameras and then dividing the time by the distance between the cameras, an average speed can be measured and used to inform motorists via VMS how long it will take them to reach a destination, or to set diversions. Example by Envitia: VMS in Aberdeen. Example by IDT: Journey time monitoring in Birmingham

Warn
Wind detectors attached to a bridge give drivers of high sided vehicles warnings before they cross. The warning messages are displayed on VMS signs activated when wind speed thresholds are exceeded. Example by Siemens: Bridge VMSs offer wind warnings .

Guide
By linking parking guidance systems to a common database traffic control room operators can inform motorists via strategic VMS about the current state of car parks; especially useful for special events like carnivals when normal use is exceeded. Example by Mott MacDonald: Car Park Guidance in Edinburgh

Previously these systems would have been impracticable due to the sheer volumes of data processing and the operator time needed to apply constant manual updates.

== Joint Chairs’ Group (JCG) ==
The JCG was created in 2004 to bring together the UDG with other key ITS community organisations; it was later expanded to include representation from the Department for Transport and the Highways Agency. The JCG's aim was to ensure that the strategic direction of the various groups and bodies involved in UK ITS was kept aligned.

The JCG was suspended in September 2012, as the prevailing financial conditions had reduced the resource available to its participants.

== UTMC links with international standards ==
UTMC builds on a base of mainstream internet protocols, and focusses on defining data structures suitable for exchange between ITS systems and devices. At the time of its origination there were few available international standards to build on, and the research was therefore used to generate many of its own standards. However, for exchange between central systems (for example, B2B data exchange between neighbouring roads authorities), UTMC refers to the specifications of the European project DATEX.

DATEX (as Datex II) is now being standardized through the European standards agency CEN and UTMC has been involved in a number of European standards-related projects, notably POSSE (Promotion of Open Specifications and Standards in Europe). There is a current workstream within UTMC aiming to align the UTMC Technical Specification more closely with Datex II.

== See also ==
- Department of Transport
- Intelligent Transport Systems
- Intermodal Journey Planner
