= Road weather information system =

Network of weather stations installed along roads

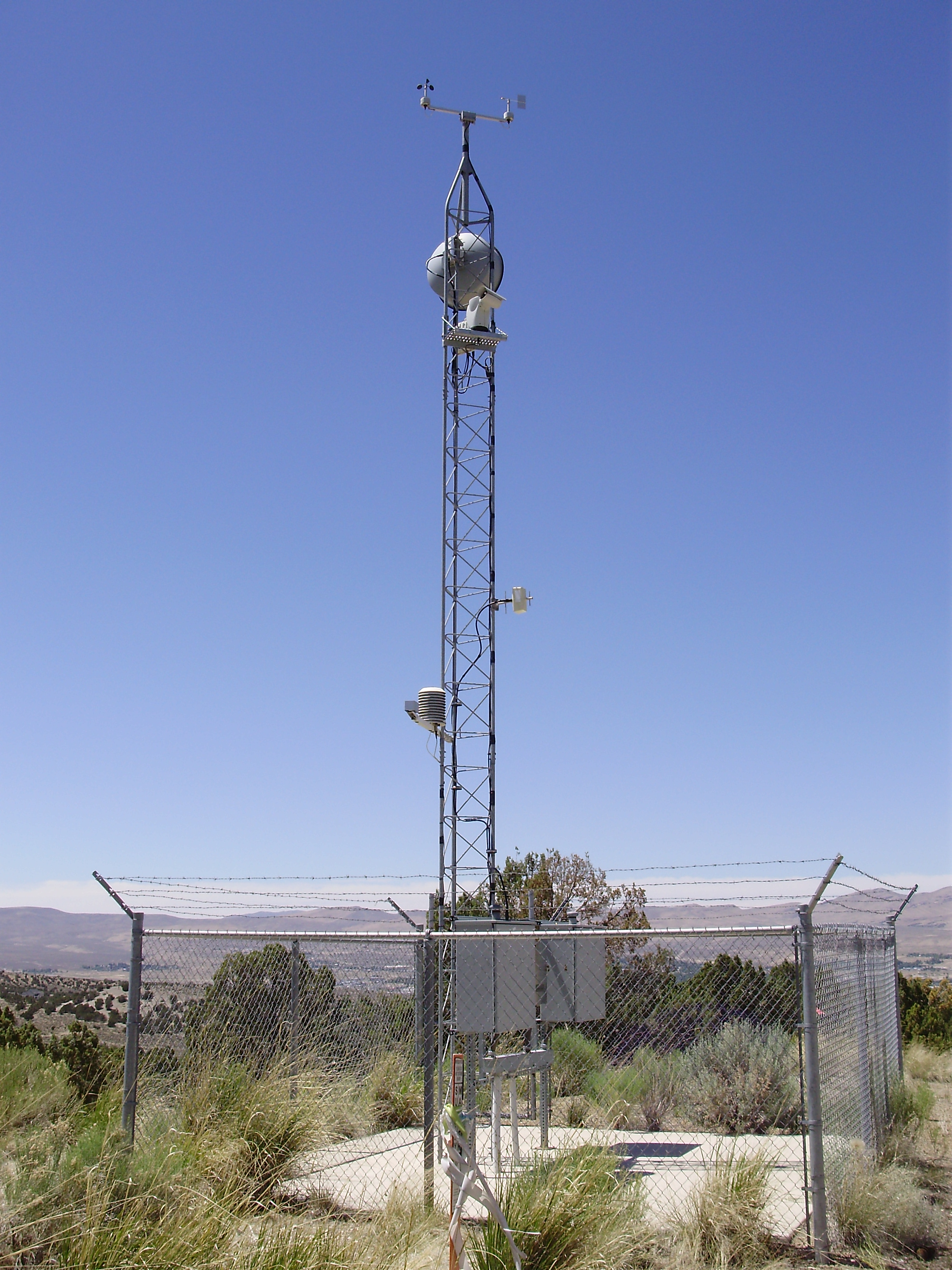
An RWIS station

A road weather information system (RWIS) comprises remote automatic weather stations (AWSs) – often technically referred to as environmental sensor stations (ESSs), as they also cover non-meteorological variables – a communication system for data transfer, and central systems to collect field data from numerous ESSs. These stations measure real-time atmospheric parameters, pavement conditions, water level conditions, visibility, and sometimes other variables. Central RWIS hardware and software are used to process observations from ESSs to develop nowcasts or forecasts, and to display or disseminate road weather information in a format that can be easily interpreted by a manager. RWIS data are used by road operators and maintainers to support decision making. Real-time RWIS data is also used by automated warning systems (AWSs). The spatial and temporal resolution of a station network can be that of a mesonet or sometimes a constituent network in a network of station networks comprising a mesonet. The data is often considered proprietary although it is typically ingested into the major numerical weather prediction models.

== Sensors ==
- Thermometer for measuring temperature and pavement conditions
- Anemometer for measuring wind speed
- Wind vane for measuring wind direction
- Visibility sensor for detecting fog and smoke
- Rain gauge for measuring precipitation
- Surface sensor (embedded) for measuring road surface temperature and status temperature, dry or wet state, water depth, chemical concentration
- Surface sensor (non-invasive) for measuring road surface temperature and status temperature, dry or wet state, water depth, chemical concentration, friction
- Sub-surface probe for measuring below-grade temperature of roadway, surface temperature and resistance
