= National ITS Architecture =

1994 US transportation system guideline

The National ITS Architecture is a guideline of the United States Government, for future transportation systems. It was established in 1994 by the United States Department of Transportation. It was funded at a cost of $20 million. The main goal was the definition of a standard national interoperable intelligent transportation system (ITS) structure.
