= Lane control lights =

Multi-Lane control system

Lane control signals for countries driving on the right. Flashing red is sometimes used instead of yellow.

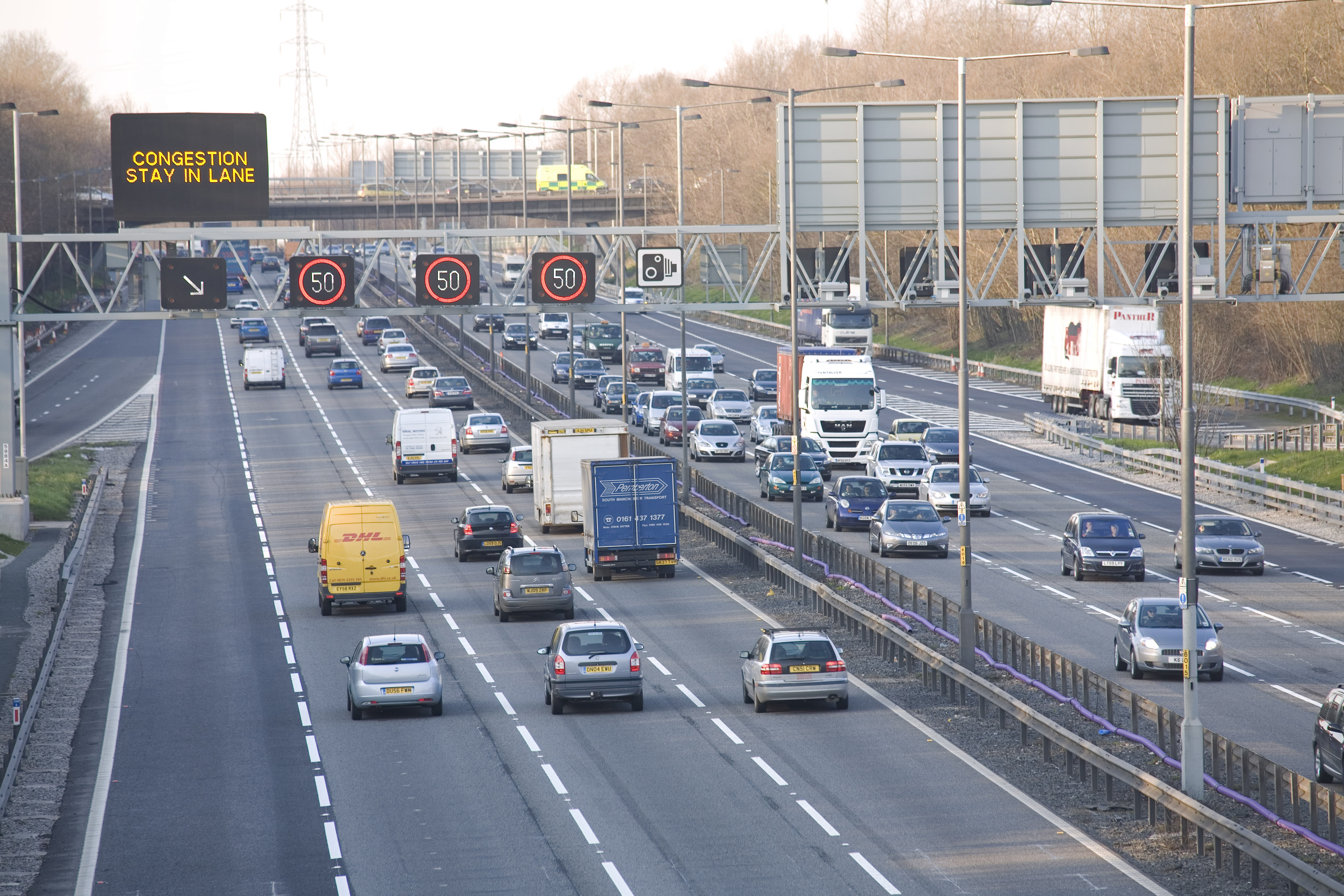
Lane control with speed limits used instead of arrows

Lane control lights are a specific type of traffic light used to manage traffic on a multi-way road or highway. Typically they allow or forbid traffic to use one or more of the available lanes by the use of Green lights or arrows (to permit) or by red lights or crosses (to prohibit). When used, they are usually repeated at regular distances to provide a continuous reminder of the lane status to drivers.

On certain multiple-lane highways, one or more lanes may be designated as counterflow lanes, meaning that the direction of traffic in those lanes can be reversed at any time (see also reversible lane). Sometimes this is done as a way of managing rush hour traffic (one or more central lanes may flow inbound in the morning and outbound in the evening); in other cases the lanes are reversed only in unusual circumstances (such as a traffic accident or road construction closing one or more of the lanes).

== Signal conventions ==
Lane control signals around the world follow their own universal pattern, as specified in the Vienna Convention on Road Signs and Signals. Typical signals include a green downward arrow, used to indicate a lane which is open to traffic facing the signal, a red cross, which indicates a lane is either reserved for opposing traffic or closed to traffic in both directions, and a flashing amber circle, arrow or cross, indicating to traffic facing the signal to immediately clear the lane.

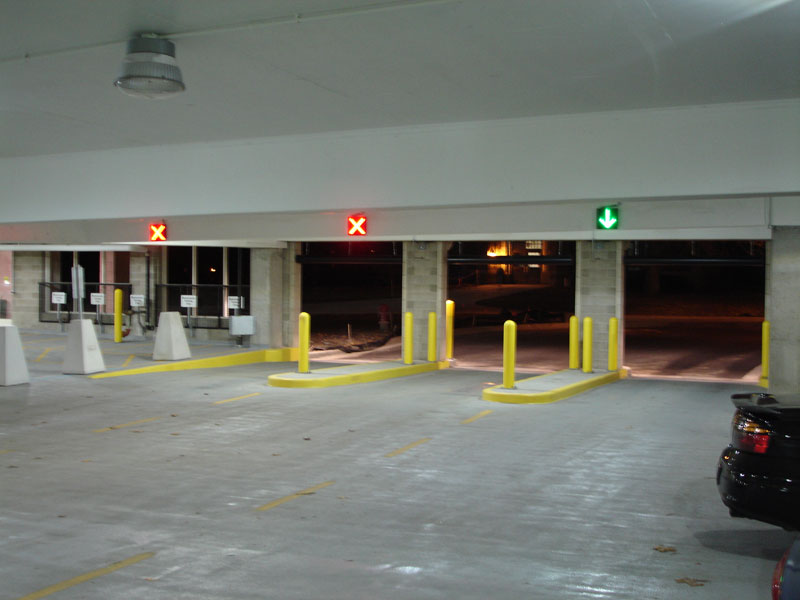
This parking ramp uses lane control signals so that the middle lane's direction may be changed according to time of day.

Unlike regular traffic lights, lane control signals either have one face each to indicate all lane conditions (the so-called "searchlight" configuration), or separate faces for each condition (as illustrated). Lane control signals of the latter type are usually placed horizontally. Signals that may indicate other conditions for roads without counterflow lanes also exist, such as those that indicate different speed limits for different lanes.

== Examples ==
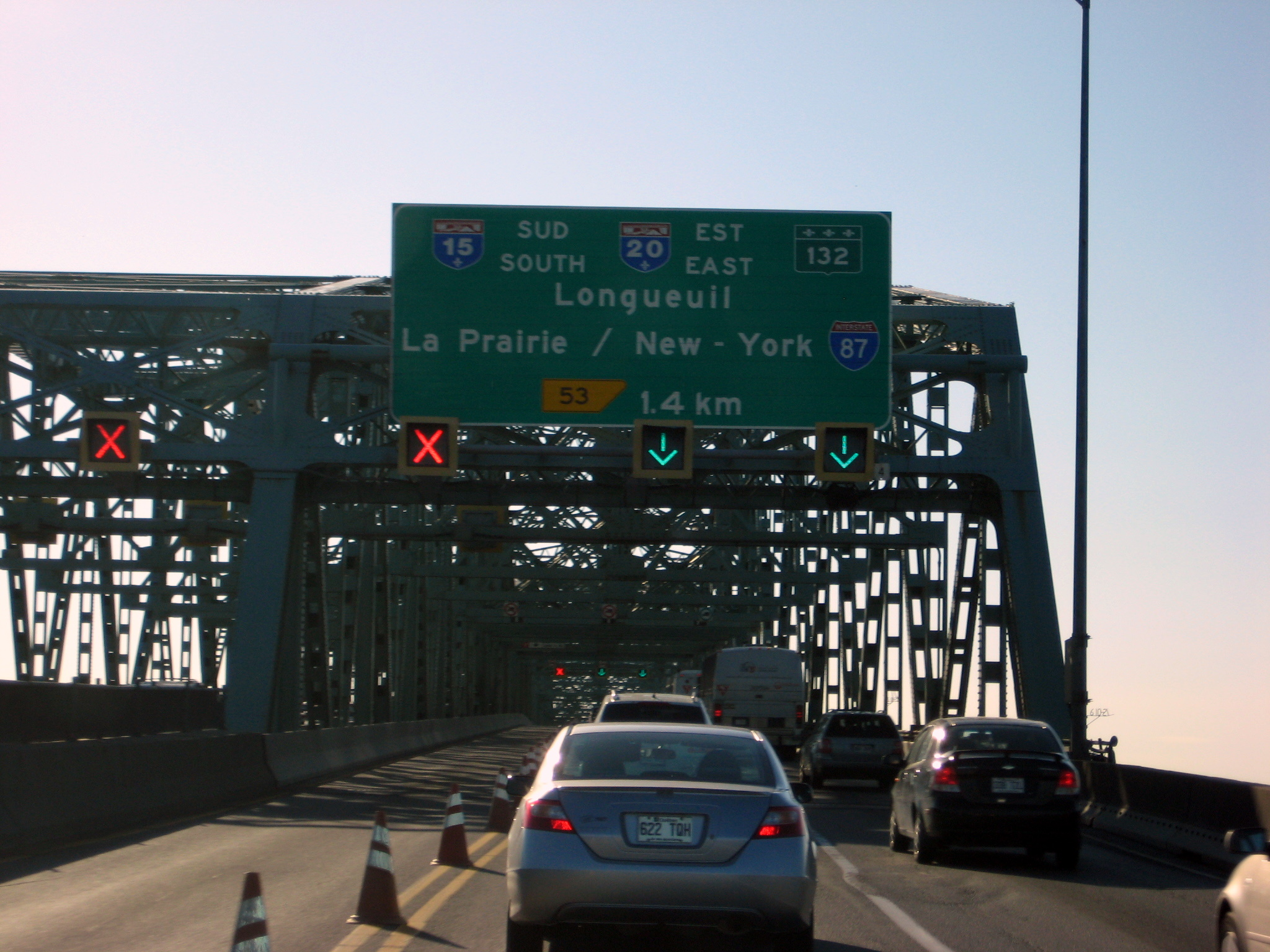
Lane control signals installed on the Old Champlain Bridge in Montréal, Canada

In the Australian state of Victoria, green and yellow are replaced by white, and there may be additional modes such as 'Centre lane turns only' at particular times of the day.

On Jarvis Street in Toronto, Edmonton and some other jurisdictions in Canada the lane control signals are employed without the use of an amber warning signal. Instead, the lane that is to undergo the direction reversal (the middle lane of a five-lane downtown street) is marked with a red cross in both directions for a short period of time. This allows time for the lane to clear of traffic before a green arrow permits traffic in the reversed direction. However, Jarvis Street was converted to a four-lane arterial with bicycle lanes in 2009, and was converted back to a five-lane road in 2012.

In Greece, they are frequently used in tunnels to indicate lane closures because of accidents or roadworks.

=== Toll plazas in the United States ===
In the United States, lane control signals are used on many toll plazas to indicate the open/closed status of toll lanes. Many older toll plazas use conventional circular red and green indications to indicate the open and closed status of toll lanes; however, the use of circular red and green signals for this purpose is now non-compliant in the 2009 Manual on Uniform Traffic Control Devices, with lane control signals being the preferred indicator. The reason for discouraging the use of circular red and green signals for indicating the open and closed status of toll lanes is due to their use being contrary to their traditional definitions of stop and go.
