= Traffic optimization =

Methods of speeding up traffic

Traffic optimization is the methods by which time stopped in road traffic (particularly, at traffic signals) is reduced.

== Need for traffic optimization ==
Texas Transportation Institute estimates travel delays of between 17–55 hours of delay per person per year relating to congestion on the streets. Traffic device optimization hence becomes a significant aspect of operations.

== Techniques ==
Several techniques exist to reduce the delay of traffic. Generally the algorithms attempt to reduce delays (user time), stops, exhaust gas emissions, or some other measure of effectiveness. Many optimization software are geared towards pre-timed coordinated systems.

Normally optimization of signals along a road is a challenging and expensive task, because the sources for traffic monitoring have been limited to inductive loops, cameras or manually counting. However, due to recent advances in information technology, portable devices with Bluetooth and Wi-Fi communication are becoming more common, enabling real-time continuous traffic monitoring and adjustments to traffic signal timing.

By placing sensors along roads, tracking Bluetooth and Wi-Fi devices in passing vehicles, the solution can accurately detect and record how long it takes a car to drive along a corridor, segment by segment and in total. This provides historical data for traditional timing methods but also enables real-time feedback to changes in signal programs along with the ability to continuously detect traffic levels and travel time to trigger transitions among programs.

Excessive city traffic can be the most frustrating part about living in urban areas. The solution to metro traffic is a well-balanced mixture of expanded public transit options, remote work, differentiated hubs within the metro area, and electronic tolls. Public transit will help commuters arrive safely at their place of work while eliminating the stress of bumper to bumper traffic. Toll roads, especially those with fluctuating tolls dependent upon the time of day and/or level of traffic, also help to improve the level of traffic by deterring some from driving the roadways. Some may choose to work remotely, or run their errands at a different time of day. Finally, differentiated business hubs within a metro area can help alleviate traffic by directing it to several different areas, rather than one centralized location. Cities that spend time and resources on making travel efficient within their borders will attract a healthier, wealthier, and happier population.

== Real time traffic control ==
Several systems are capable of monitoring the traffic arrivals and adjusting timings based on the detected inputs. Traffic Detectors may range from Metal Detectors to Detectors that use Image Detection. Metal detectors are the most popular in use. Image detection devices exhibit numerous problems including degradation during bad weather and lighting.

Traffic actuated signal systems use detectors to adjust timing for:

1. Only the main street - semi-actuated system
2. Both main and cross streets - fully actuated system.

The above method is primitive real-time signal optimization at best. This method will optimize one traffic signal at a time. However, in the real world, a motorist's commute involves driving through multiple signals. Thus, multiple traffic signals need to be collectively synchronized in order to be effective. One such system that has gained significant popularity in the United States is InSync.

== Criticism ==
It has been suggested that the benefits of traffic optimization have never been scientifically justified. It inherently favors motorized traffic over alternate modes such as pedestrians, bicyclists, and transit users and may promote more auto use. It is suggested that an alternate approach could involve traffic calming, and a conceptual focus on the movement of people and goods rather than vehicles.

It can be argued that Traffic optimization inherently calms traffic due to discouraging speeding and limits acceleration and deceleration thus reducing the noise pollution produced by vehicles.

== See also ==
- Intelligent Traffic Systems
- Traffic assignment
- Wardrop equilibrium
