= County roads in Ohio =

County Roads
- Three of the most common county road marker designs in Ohio

System information
- Maintained by Ohio county highway departments
- Length: 29,088 mi (46,813 km)
- Formed: February 17, 1804

System links
- County roads in Ohio

County roads in Ohio comprise 29,088 center line miles (46,813 km), making up 24% of the state's public roadways as of April 2015. Ohio state law delegates the maintenance and designation of these county roads to the boards of commissioners and highway departments of its 88 counties. Each county has distinct construction, signage, and naming practices for the roads under its jurisdiction. Within each county, townships maintain separate township road networks under the advice of the county engineer. Each board of county commissioners certifies the total county- and township-maintained mileage within its county. The Ohio Department of Transportation catalogues these certifications on an annual basis.

== Characteristics ==
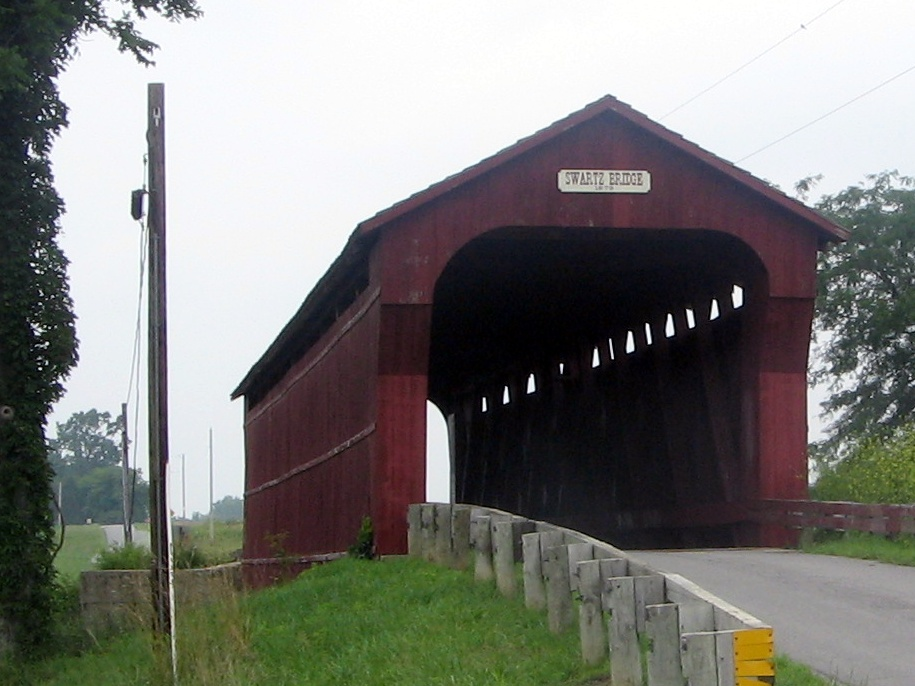
Swartz Covered Bridge carries Wyandot County Road 130 over the Sandusky River. Covered bridges can be found along many rural county roads in Ohio.

A public, non-state-maintained road must meet at least one of the following conditions in order for the county board of commissioners to have authority over it:

- Connects one public road to another
- Connects a public road to a public school, park, recreation area, or airfield
- Connects a public road to at least three private residences or businesses in the first 500 feet (150 m) and one private residence or business in each 200 feet (61 m) thereafter

The county is not responsible for any roads within the corporation limits of a city or village. When the state abandons a state highway, any right of way outside corporation limits reverts to county or township control.

Generally, county road rights of way are required to be at least 30 feet (9.1 m) wide, allowing for two lanes of traffic, although rights of way as narrow as 20 feet (6.1 m) may be allowed for one-lane roads under a grandfather clause. Before 1915, the law that regulated the width of county roads changed frequently, at times imposing a maximum width of 60 or 66 feet (18 or 20 m).

A 2012 study by the County Engineers Association of Ohio (CEAO) found that 1,619 miles (2,606 km) of county roads are resurfaced annually, from a combined budget of $229 million for county road maintenance and bridge replacement. In 1997, the CEAO reported that 8% of county roads were unpaved, and that county roads were resurfaced every 17 years on average.

The maximum speed limit for an undivided county road is 55 miles per hour (90 km/h) in an unincorporated area. Within municipal corporation limits, the speed limit may be lower based on land use. Counties differ on whether all-terrain vehicles are allowed to be ridden on county roads.

== History ==
On February 17, 1804, an act of the General Assembly gave boards of county commissioners the authority to open roads. Around 1820, the office of county surveyor was first given a role in road and bridge development. Plank roads could be brought under county supervision beginning on January 25, 1861, and commissioners were authorized to build turnpikes on February 16, 1870. Road maintenance responsibilities passed from the county surveyor to the county engineer in 1928.

In the 1972 Ohio Manual of Uniform Traffic Control Devices (OMUTCD), revision 21, issued 1999, the standard county route shield was a white rectangle bearing a black legend; the blue pentagon was considered an alternative design for a system of important county roads. In 1974, Ottawa County became the first county in Ohio to post the blue markers. The blue pentagon became the standard in the 2003 edition of the MUTCD, relegating the white rectangle to an alternative status.

== Naming ==
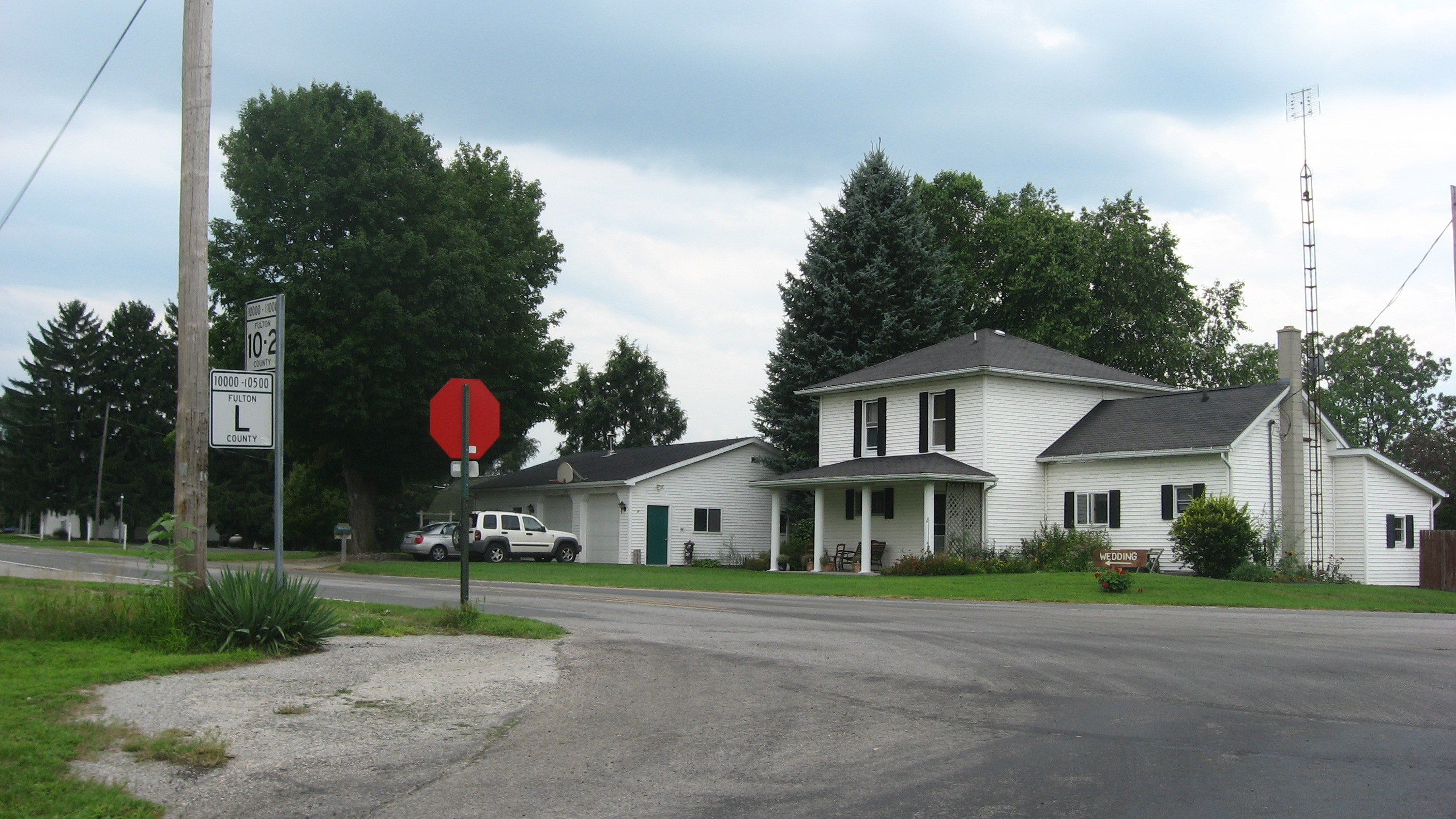
Fulton County Road 10-2 runs north to south, slightly to the west of a section line, intersecting County Road L.

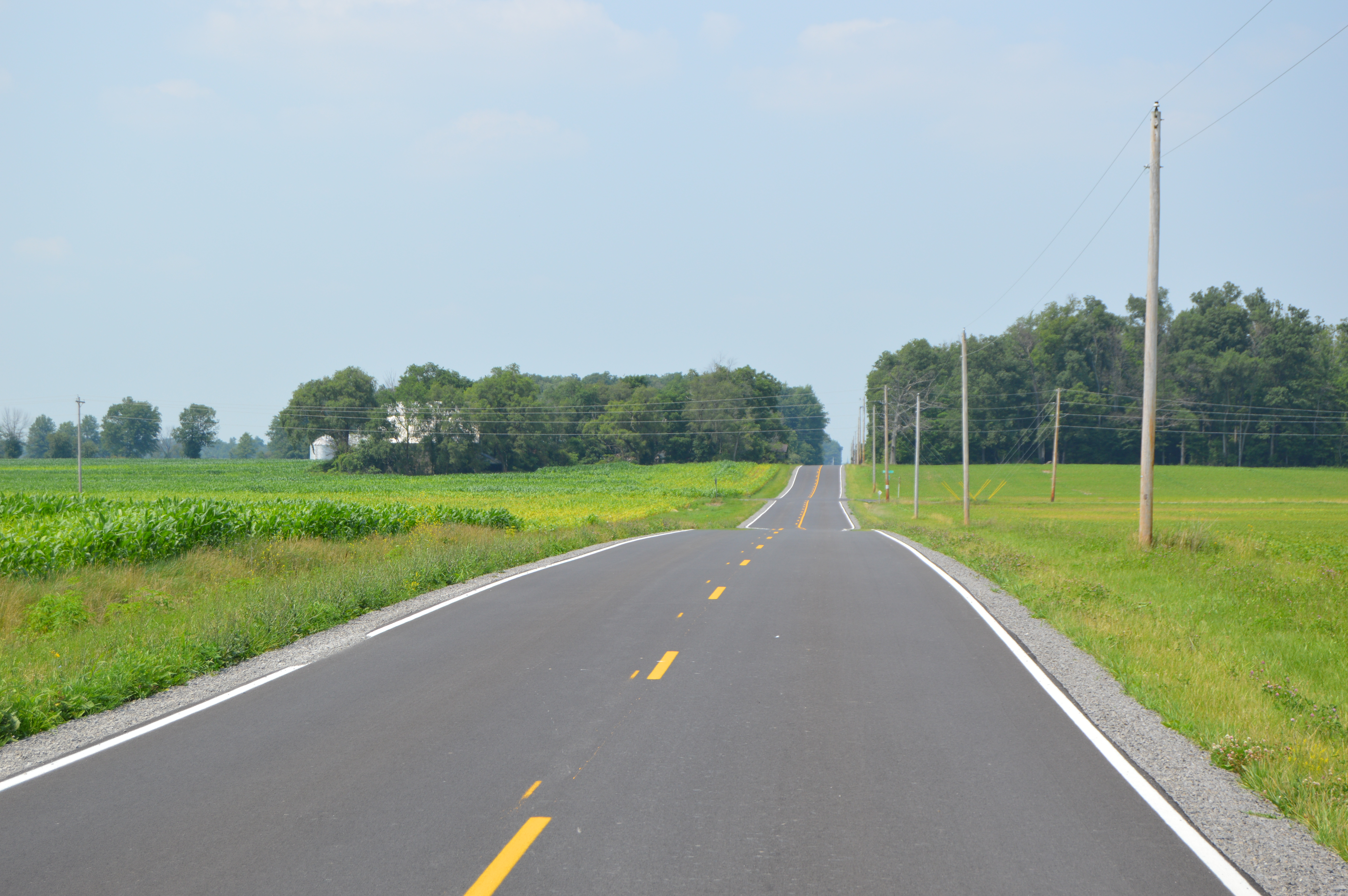
Hancock County Road 698 was part of Ohio State Route 698 until 2007.

Ohio law requires the county engineer to name and number every public road under the county's jurisdiction. Terminology varies from county to county: "county roads", "county routes", and "county highways" are variously abbreviated "CR", "C-", "CH", "Co. Rd.", and "CO" on signage. In several northwestern Ohio counties, the county and township road networks form a grid along survey section lines, and each route is given an alphanumeric, sometimes decimal number based on its location within the county. In these counties, county lines often run down the middle of county roads; each side of the road may have a different number. Most counties in neighboring Indiana use a similar system. Many former alignments of U.S. and state routes, particularly U.S. Routes 25 and 40, are now maintained as county routes that retain their former route numbers.

== Signage ==
Roughly half of Ohio's 88 counties signpost county routes with prominent markers; the rest post numbers either on standard street and crossroads signage or on obscure mileposts. For counties that do utilize county road markers, the Ohio Department of Transportation's Ohio Manual of Uniform Traffic Control Devices (OMUTCD) specifies two designs, the gold-on-blue pentagon found in the national MUTCD and an alternative black-on-white square also found in some other states.

However, not all counties follow the state standard: many county highway departments use unique designs on any county-maintained signposts, ranging from Athens County's simple green square with white legend, to Vinton County's yellow square with stenciled black legend, to Scioto County's white county outline on an orange square. Henry County uses Arial Bold lettering instead of the standard Highway Gothic typeface. In 2022, Holmes County introduced a green shield bearing the county outline as part of a program to improve road safety and reduce costs by moving sign manufacturing in house.

=== County road marker designs by county ===
Ashland

Athens

Auglaize

Belmont

Carroll

Columbiana

Coshocton

Fairfield

Fulton

Gallia

Guernsey

Hardin

Harrison

Henry

Hocking

Holmes

Jefferson

Knox

Lawrence

Licking

Logan

Madison

Mahoning

Medina

Miami

Monroe

Morgan

Morrow

Noble

Ottawa

Paulding

Perry

Scioto

Seneca

Shelby

Stark

Summit

Trumbull

Tuscarawas

Union (Not commonly used.)

Vinton

Washington

Wayne

Williams

Wyandot

== See also ==
- List of numbered highways in Ohio
