= County highway =

Type of highway

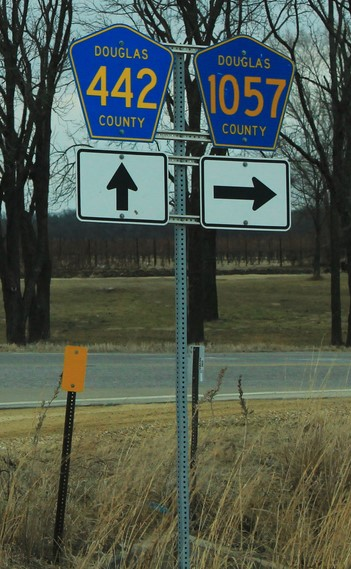
Intersection of CR-442 and CR-1057 in Douglas County, Kansas, between Lawrence and Eudora

A county highway (also county road or county route; usually abbreviated CH or CR) is a road in the United States and in the Canadian province of Ontario that is designated and/or maintained by the county highway department. Route numbering can be determined by each county alone, by mutual agreement among counties, or by a statewide pattern.

Any county-maintained road, whether it is assigned a number or not, can be called a county road. (Note: For example, in the state of Michigan, all roads that are not under the jurisdiction of the Michigan Department of Transportation or a city or village are under the jurisdiction of a county road commission. Under state law, these county-maintained roadways are then classified as primary county roads or local county roads, regardless if those roads then carry a signed designation number or not as signage and numbering practices vary in the state's 83 counties.) Depending on the state or province and county, these roads can be named after geographic features, communities, or people. Or they may be assigned a name determined by a standardized grid reference: "East 2000" would be a north–south road running 20 blocks/miles/km east of the designated zero point. Many other variations are also used. Many locales have somewhat arbitrarily assigned numbers for all county roads, but with no number-signage at all or only on standard street name blades.

County roads and highways vary greatly in design standards, funding, and regularity of maintenance. Some county highways in urban areas are freeways or expressways. County roads that link communities or serve residential areas are often indistinguishable from state highways or residential streets. In rural areas, many county roads carry very little traffic and are maintained infrequently. They may be in poor condition (if paved) or not paved at all. In remote areas, county roads may be sand, gravel, or graded earth, only occasionally seeing foot, equestrian, and four wheel drive traffic. Some states, such as Wisconsin, use county highways in great numbers, linking major highways and cities or towns to each other. Wisconsin also maintains a Rustic Road system where local routes are purposefully maintained as dirt or gravel roads in order to not interfere with natural scenery and preserve them in their past state.

== United States ==
Current county highway marker in many states

Example of a Wisconsin county trunk highway marker

Example of a Minnesota inter-county highway marker

County highway markers are usually a yellow-on-blue pentagon (the Manual on Uniform Traffic Control Devices standard pattern) or a black-on-white square (largely older signs). Some states, like Virginia and North Carolina, have no county highways in most of their counties: the state government maintains all roads in unincorporated areas. In West Virginia, the state maintains secondary roads though they may be designated as county routes. Other states, like Connecticut, have no county routes because there is no government at the county level. Alaska's county-equivalent boroughs maintain roads in unincorporated areas but none are numbered. Louisiana's county equivalent of parishes have parish routes.

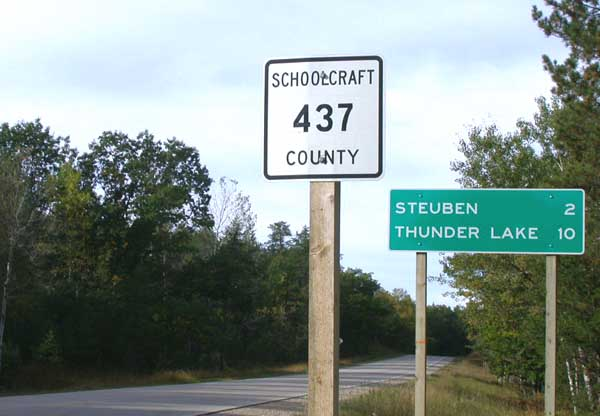
Another standard style of county highway marker from Schoolcraft County, Michigan, used in some U.S. states

In the United States, county highways are denoted or signed in various ways, differing by state. In Wisconsin, county highways are marked with letters—with one- to three-letter combinations (i.e.: C, CC, or CCC). Wisconsin's county highways are frequently and clearly marked at most intersections. Because county road names are not exclusive, a state may have many county roads with similar or identical names. In states like Illinois, county highways are marked either with a number (usually one or two digits), a single letter followed by a one- or two-digit number (i.e.: V-34, A-29), or in Rock Island County, with letters like Wisconsin but on a blue pentagon marker. These highways are usually marked at the beginning of the highway and occasionally throughout the route; they cannot be relied on as geographic directions the way more major highways are (state or interstate). In New Jersey, there are two sets of county routes: the 500-series (500–599), part of a statewide system which usually run through multiple counties, but are county-maintained; and the non-500 routes which are usually contained within a single county and are repeated in different counties. The latter generally use numbers in the 600-series; some counties have routes in the 700s and 800s. Two counties, Bergen and Monmouth, along with some routes in Ocean County, have routes outside this range with one- or two-digit numbers along with some numbers in the 100s. New Jersey's county routes are usually signed just as well as state routes (with mile- and half-mileposts), and will appear on freeway exit signage.

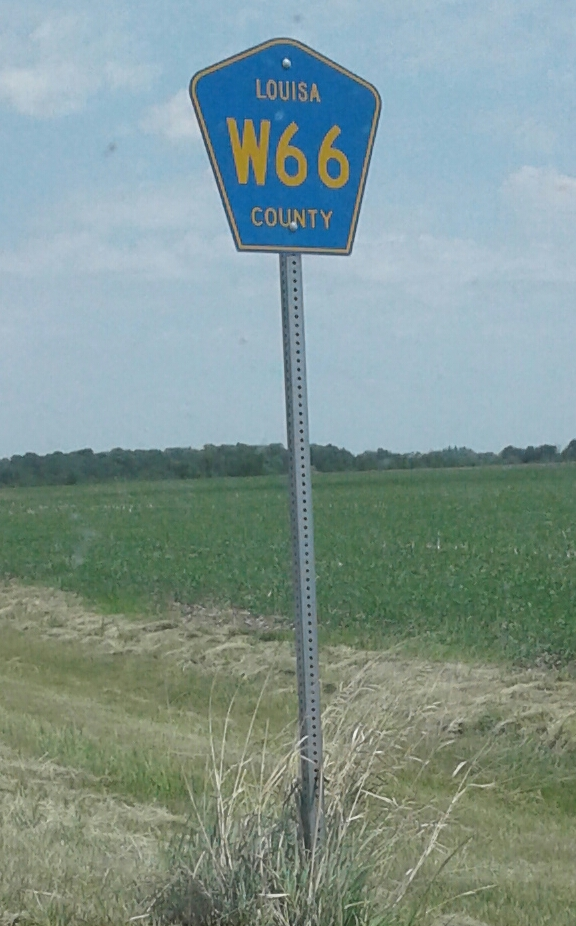
Typical signage used on a county highway in Iowa, as seen along CR W66 in Louisa County, Iowa, south of Cotter

In Iowa, secondary roads are defined simply by the Iowa Code as "those roads under county jurisdiction." The 99 counties in Iowa divide the secondary road system into farm-to-market roads and area service roads. Farm-to-market roads are maintained by the county and, paid for from a special fund: the Farm-to-Market Road Fund consists of federal secondary-road aid and 8% of Iowa's road use taxes. The farm-to-market road system is limited to 35,000 miles (56,000 km). Unlike most states, Iowa's signed secondary roads are not numbered on a county-by-county basis. With exception to County Road 105, secondary roads use a uniform numbering grid using one letter and two or three numbers, e.g., E41. County roads running primarily east and west are assigned letters (from north to south) A through J. County roads running primarily north and south are assigned letters (from west to east) K through Z. The letters I, O, Q, and U are not used.

In Minnesota, some county roads are known as county state aid highways. These roads are constructed and maintained by counties, but they are eligible for funding from the County State Aid Highway Fund. Differences in signage between CSAH routes and other county roads depends on the county. Some counties, such as Stearns County, delineate between the two by using the standard blue pentagon marker for CSAH routes and a normal white square marker for other county roads. Most county roads in Minnesota are designated with numbers, although a few non-CSAHs in Dodge County utilize letters. A few roads that cross county borders are also signed with an inter-county designation and a letter.

Many counties in Ohio use markers to designate county roads. Ohio's county roads vary widely in construction, signage, and naming from county to county. Seneca County uses the default blue pentagon marker and limited signage (generally only at intersections); Logan County uses a square white marker with a black border (similar to the St. Louis County design in Missouri) and signage is nearly comparable to state route signage, with advance signage of intersections with county roads and termini; and Scioto County uses a marker with a county outline.

== Canada ==
In Canada, numbered county roads are only found in Ontario, where they are similar to American county highways. Ontario county or regional roads are marked with trapezoid-shaped signs, usually (but not necessarily) with a white, black, green, or blue background, and normally identifying the county or region responsible for the road's maintenance, sometimes with the jurisdiction's coat of arms or corporate logo. The county road network has been present for many years, but has only been signed with the flowerpot logos since the 1970s and early 1980s (depending on the area). Previously, the roads simply had road names, such as "Essex Road 42" or "Kent County Road 14", and so on, but had no markers to designate them. Many Ontario county roads are built to provincial highway standards, as thousands of kilometres of highways were downloaded from the province to counties and regional municipalities in 1997 and 1998, and most of the downloaded highways were rolled into the county road systems. In some situations, these in turn were downloaded from the region/county to the local municipalities.

Not all jurisdictions in Ontario which maintain a numbered road system use the name "County Road" to designate them, however — depending on the official name of the jurisdiction which maintains them, they may instead be designated as a Regional Road, Municipal Road, Regional Highway, County Highway, District Road, Township Road, or City Road. In the unincorporated districts of Northern Ontario, as there is no county level of government the province maintains a secondary highway system to serve the same function.

In addition to county roads, many civil townships also have concession roads and (civil) township roads, such as Colchester South Road 3, and Concession 8. These usually do not have markers (only names on signs and maps). One exception is former Highway 620, which had a change in supervision.

This is to be contrasted with survey township roads which exist in Alberta after the 1981 Alberta rural addressing system was introduced. Range roads will run north to south, while (survey) township roads run east to west.

Highway 620 in Ontario, was downloaded to the Peterborough and Hastings county governments, and in one section, the highway was downloaded further to the township of Wollaston, and is now signed Wollaston Township 620, with a municipal sign similar to an Ontario tertiary highway. A number of townships in Wellington County sign their township road system in a similar manner.

County/Regional roads in Ontario are styled by this basic "Flowerpot" design. This marker is of Durham Regional Road 2A.

Variant Durham regional road marker for regional highways, a special class of the regional road system of Durham Region. This marker is of Durham Regional Highway 2.

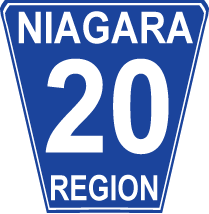
Niagara Regional Road 20 marker. While Niagara generally conforms to the standard Ontario "flowerpot" design, the markers are white-on-blue rather than the more traditional black-on-white and have rounded corners.

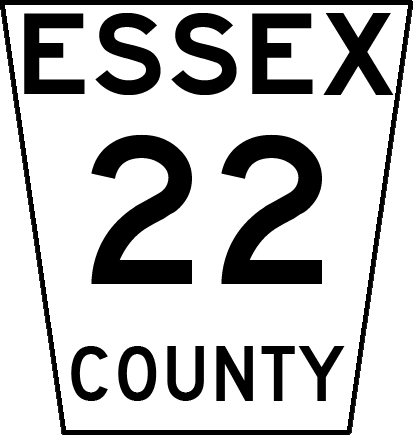
Essex County Road 22 marker, a typical county road marker in Essex County, Ontario.

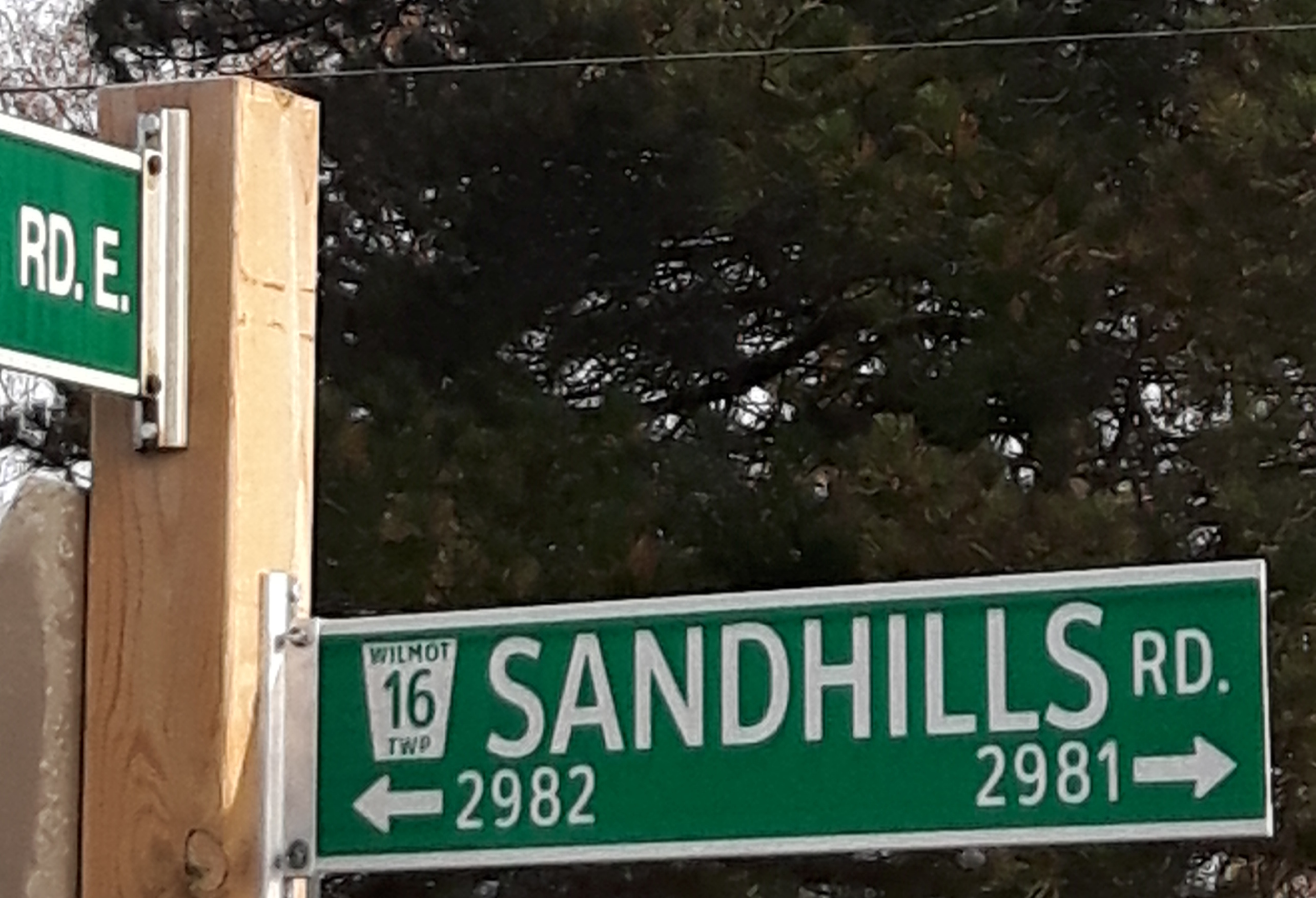
A township road marker imposed on a street name sign blade in Wilmot Township, Waterloo Region, Ontario. The marker is for Wilmot Township Road 16.

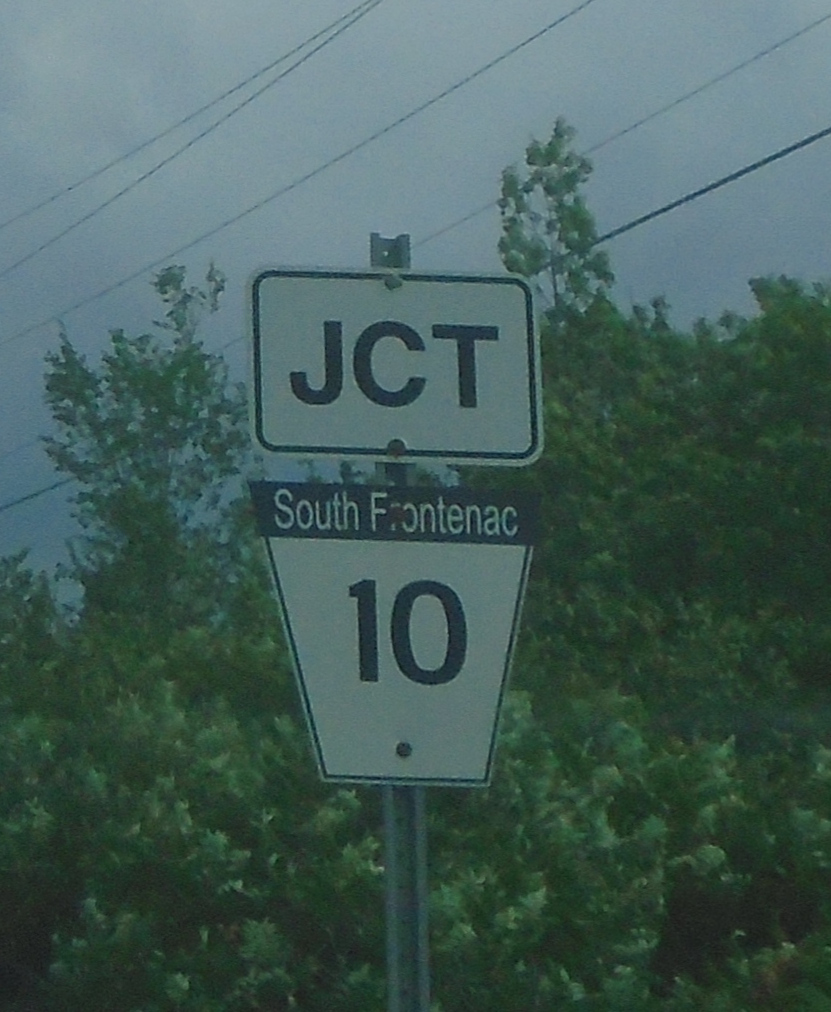
A township road marker of the typical trapezoidal shape in South Frontenac Township, Frontenac County, Ontario. This marker is of South Frontenac Township Road 10.

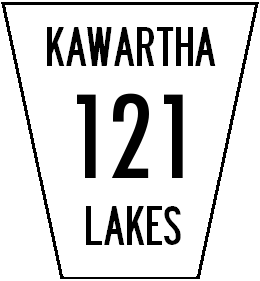
City route marker of Kawartha Lakes Road 121 in the City of Kawartha Lakes, Ontario.

== Germany ==
Some German states also have a system of roads maintained by the kreis (county or district) known as a kreisstraße. These roads are numbered similarly to county routes in the U.S and Ontario. These roads carry traffic between the cities, towns and villages within a kreis and sometimes between two kreis. Most kreisstraße are two-lane roads but can also be built as limited access dual carriageways in urban areas.

== Elsewhere ==
In England and Wales, county road, as alluded to in section 29 et seq. of the Local Government Act 1929, was the term used to refer to any road for which a county council was the responsible highway authority.

== See also ==
- County routes in California
- County roads in Florida
- County roads in Iowa
- List of County-Designated Highways in Michigan
- County roads in Minnesota
- County routes in New Jersey
- County routes in New York
- County roads in Ohio
- County Trunk Highways (Wisconsin)
- List of county roads in Ontario
- Quadrant route (Pennsylvania)
- List of Winnipeg City Routes
