= Numbered highways in Ohio =

Highway system of Ohio in the United States

- Standard Highway markers for Ohio

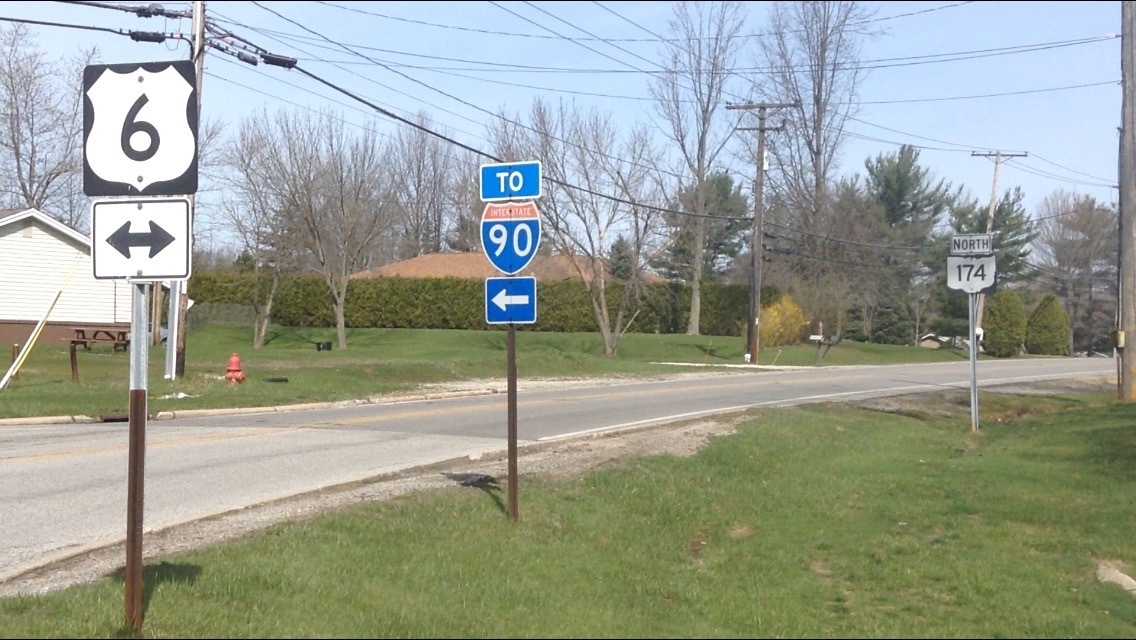
- US 6 at State Route 174 in Willoughby Hills, Lake County

Highway names
- Interstates: Interstate nn (I-nn)
- US Highways: U.S. Route nn (US nn)
- State: State Route nn (SR nn)

System links
- Ohio State Highway System; Interstate; US; State; Scenic

The Ohio Department of Transportation (ODOT) is responsible for the establishment and classification of a state highway network which includes interstate highways, U.S. highways, and state routes. As with other states, U.S. and Interstate highways are classified as state routes in Ohio. There are no state routes which duplicate an existing U.S. or Interstate highway in Ohio.

Ohio distinguishes between "state routes", which are all the routes on ODOT's system, and "state highways", which are the roads on the state route system which ODOT maintains, i.e. those outside municipalities, with a special provision for Interstate Highways. Besides the state highway network, there are various county and township road networks within the state.

ODOT permits business routes but only "where an ODOT-maintained highway has been constructed on a new alignment which bypasses the CBD [central business district] of a municipality and no other ODOT-maintained highway provides a direct two-way connection between the bypass route and the CBD, or where the existing guide signing does not adequately direct the driver from the bypass route to the CBD and back to the bypass route."

== History ==
The Ohio Inter-County Highways were created on June 9, 1911, with the passage of the McGuire Bill (Senate Bill 165, 79th Ohio General Assembly). Main Market Roads, the most important of the system, were defined on April 15, 1913.

In 1923 the numbering system was simplified. It was altered further in 1927 in order to accommodate numbers in the United States Numbered Highway System.

In 1935 the Ohio General Assembly passed a law which added 5,000 miles of roads to the state highway system over a 12-month period. These roads were assigned route numbers in the 500s, 600s, and 700s.

In 1962 certain numbers were retired to accommodate numbers in the Interstate Highway System.

== Highway systems ==
Interstate Highways: A list of interstate highways within Ohio.
U.S. Routes: A list of U.S. highways within Ohio.
State Routes: A list of all state routes within Ohio.
County roads: An overview of the county roads in Ohio
Ohio Turnpike: A toll road carrying Interstate 90, Interstate 80, and Interstate 76.

== See also ==
- 1927 Ohio state highway renumbering
- Transportation in Ohio
