= DriveOhio =

Ohio self-driving vehicle initiative

- Formation: January 18, 2018; 8 years ago
- Type: Governmental organization
- Headquarters: Columbus, Ohio
- Leader: Preeti Choudhary
- Parent organization: ODOT
- Website: drive.ohio.gov

DriveOhio is an initiative within the Ohio Department of Transportation that aims to organize and accelerate smart vehicle and connected vehicle projects in the state of Ohio. It offers to be the single point of contact for policy makers, agencies, researchers, and private companies to collaborate with one another on smart transportation efforts around the state.

== Mission ==
DriveOhio's mission is to serve as Ohio's central hub for "smart mobility", which it defines as the use of technology to move people and goods from one place to another as effectively as possible. In principle this includes all modes of transportation, including autonomous vehicles, drones, and ride sharing services. However, the initial focus of DriveOhio is to enable cars to connect with and communicate with highway infrastructure, through a fiber optic road network. Specific mission items for the center are established in Ohio Executive Order 2018-01K, which refers to DriveOhio as "the statewide center for smart mobility":

- Establish communication between the agencies building Ohio's infrastructure and the organizations which are developing mobility technology.
- Serve as the point of contact for mobility technology organizations that want to innovate in Ohio.
- Help Ohio's government to plan for the future of transportation technology. This includes the development of policies, goals, recommendations, and operating standards.
- Help to locate financing for new technology.
- Work with other state agencies to help Ohio workers transition toward future transportation jobs.

== History ==
DriveOhio was formed through an executive order by Ohio Governor John Kasich on January 18, 2018. The desire to attract investments and jobs in Ohio was a motivator for creating the program. Jim Barna, formerly the Chief Engineer for ODOT, was made executive director of the new organization. Besides establishing DriveOhio, the executive order also mandates that all state vehicles be equipped with on-board communication devices by 2023.

Less than a month after formation, on February 8, 2018, DriveOhio held its first Smart Mobility Summit as a public/private exchange of ideas.

On May 9, 2018, Executive Order 2018-04K was signed, which authorizes autonomous vehicles to begin testing in Ohio. Participating companies and municipalities are required to coordinate through DriveOhio.

On July 9, 2018, the Transportation Research Center, an automotive proving ground near East Liberty, broke ground on a new facility for testing autonomous and connected vehicles called the SMARTCenter. This center will offer a variety of test scenarios for evaluating autonomous vehicles, and will be equipped with the wireless sensors used by connected vehicles.

== Structure ==
The executive director is appointed by and reports to the current Director of ODOT, and may staff the organization as necessary. There are also two all-volunteer boards, the DriveOhio Government Advisory Board and the DriveOhio Expert Advisory Board. The Government Board represents local government, and the Expert Board represents particular industries. The chairs of both boards are selected by the ODOT Director, and all other members are chosen by the Governor, with no set limit on the size of each board.

DriveOhio also absorbed ODOT's UAS Center division, formerly the Ohio/Indiana UAS Center. The DriveOhio UAS Center is headed by Director Fred Judson, and is headquartered at the Springfield–Beckley Municipal Airport in Springfield, Ohio. Its mission is to safely study and apply unmanned aerial systems (UAS) technology in the State of Ohio.

== Projects ==
The agencies which participate in DriveOhio oversee a variety of transportation-related projects.

- U.S. 33 Smart Mobility Corridor. A 35-mile section of U.S. 33 will be furnished with fiber-optic cable and dedicated short-range communication (DSRC) units, placed every 600 meters.
- Connected Marysville. The City of Marysville and ODOT will be equipping some of their vehicles, along with the vehicles of volunteers, with onboard units to communicate with the highway DSRCs. Honda, which operates the Marysville Auto Plant, will also be providing onboard units for the vehicles of local employees. These joint efforts are expected to result in 10% of all Marysville traffic being able to actively communicate with the highway infrastructure. The vehicle data will initially be used in conjunction with smart traffic signals to try to improve traffic flow and safety. It is also claimed to eventually provide guidance to snow and ice cleanup crews.
- I-670 SmartLane. A nine-mile section of I-670 will be turned into the state's first "smart lane", in which the highway shoulder can be enabled as an extra lane on demand. Construction began on June 27, 2018.
- Smart Columbus. The City of Columbus received $50 million in grants to build a smart transportation system. The initiative has many ongoing projects and is seeking additional funding. The city offers a "Smart Columbus Experience Center" to the public.

=== Other projects ===
- I-90 Lake Effect Corridor. A 60-mile section of Interstate 90, located in the far northeast "Snow Belt" corner of the state, will have DSRC units installed along its length. Wireless units will also be installed on public service vehicles to test the communication system. This area was chosen as a pilot because of its dangerous lake-effect snow conditions. I-90 is part of the "Smart Belt Coalition" between Ohio, Michigan, and Pennsylvania.
- Ohio Turnpike. Similar to the I-90 project, the Ohio Turnpike will also receive DSRC units, along with units in a set of test vehicles.
- Ground-Based Detect and Avoid Drone Pilot. The UAS Center is partnering with the Air Force Research Laboratory in a test program to fly UAS aircraft in the National Airspace System (NAS) beyond visual line of sight. This requires the development of an unmanned traffic management (UTM) system to track commercial flights, drones, and low-altitude passenger craft. Another facet of the project is provided air-based traffic monitoring on the 33 Smart Mobility Corridor.
- Possible future projects include an I-75 smart corridor that extends up into Michigan.
