= Ohio county government =

Legal and administrative structure of counties in Ohio

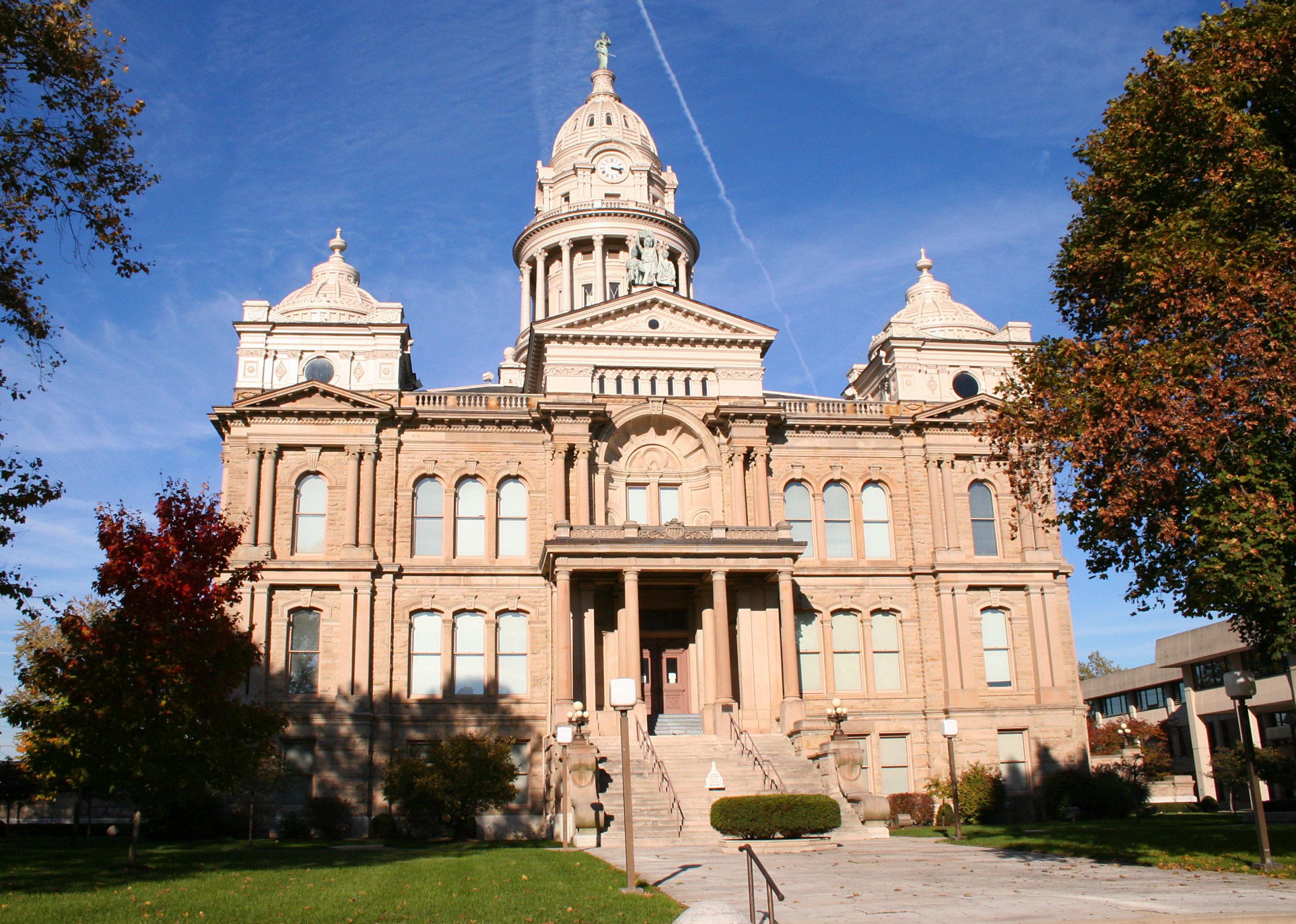
Miami county courthouse in Troy

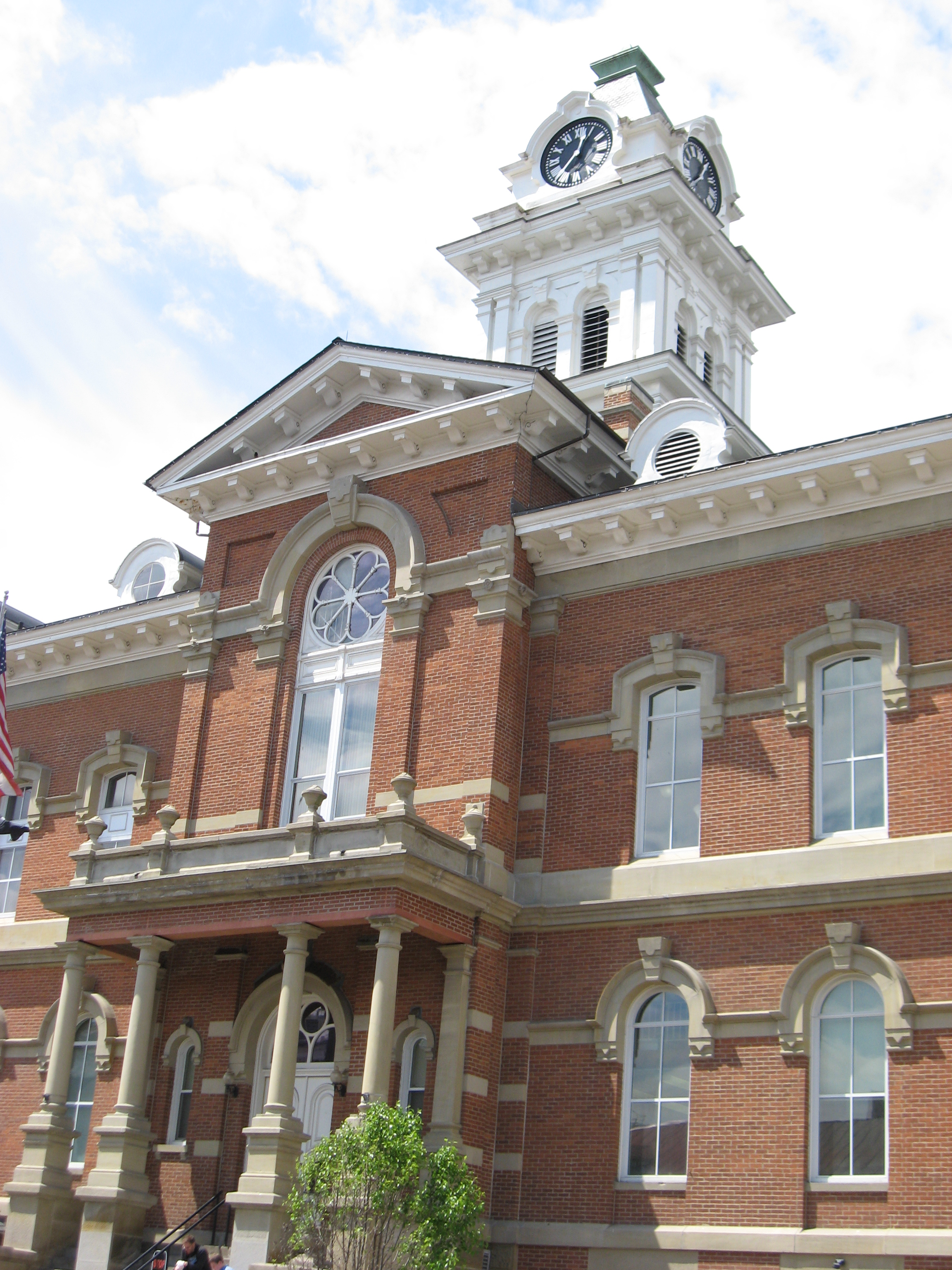
Athens county courthouse in Athens

Ohio county government is the structure of official managerial and legal bodies of the counties of Ohio, USA. It is marked by a loose organization and a diffusion of power, the basic framework not having been changed since the nineteenth century. The Ohio Constitution allows counties to set up a home rule charter government as many cities and villages do, but only Summit and Cuyahoga counties have done so.

Counties operating under a constitutional government operate under Dillon's Rule. They are creatures of the state, and have only those powers granted to them by the Ohio General Assembly and the Ohio Constitution, any power implied by those express powers, and those powers essential to their existence. However, Article X of the Ohio Constitution gives county government benefits similar to those conferred on cities and villages under the home rule amendments of 1912.

== Officials ==
Eighty-six of Ohio's 88 counties (all except Summit as of 1981 and Cuyahoga as of 2011) have the following elected officials as provided by statute:

- Three county commissioners (the Board of Commissioners): Control budget; oversee planning and approve zoning regulations where county rural zoning is implemented; approve annexations to cities and villages; set overall policy; oversee departments under their control
- County auditor: Values property for taxation; issues dog, kennel, and cigarette licenses; issues licenses for retailers for sales tax purposes; inspects scales, fuel pumps, etc., used in commerce to see that they are accurate; maintains county accounting records and issues annual financial reports
- County clerk of court of common pleas: Keeps filings of lawsuits and orders of the county Court of Common Pleas, issues and records titles for motor vehicles
- County coroner: Determines causes of death in certain cases; can serve as acting county commissioner if needed to meet quorum on the board of county commissioners; is the only person with the power to arrest the sheriff.
- County engineer: Maintains county roads and land maps
- Prosecuting attorney: Prosecutes felonies and is the legal advisor to all other county officials and departments
- County recorder: Keeps all land records, including deeds, surveys, mortgages, easements, and liens
- County treasurer: Collects taxes, invests county money, provides financial oversight to municipalities and school districts in the county
- County sheriff: Chief law enforcement officer, polices areas without local police, runs the county jail, acts as officer of the local courts (transporting prisoners, serving subpoenas, acting as bailiff, etc.)

All of these officials are elected to four-year terms in November of even-numbered years after being nominated in partisan primary elections. One commissioner and the auditor are elected in the same year as the governor in one cycle; the other two commissioners and the other officials are elected in the same year as the president of the United States. The clerk, coroner, engineer, prosecutor, recorder, and sheriff begin their terms on the first Monday in January. The auditor's term begins on the second Monday in March. The treasurer's term begins on the first Monday in September. The commissioner who is elected with the governor begins his term on January 1. Of the other two seats, one term begins on January 2 and the second on January 3.

=== Requirements to serve ===
Any citizen of Ohio and the United States who is 18 years of age or older and lives in the county may run for commissioner, auditor, treasurer, clerk of courts, or recorder. The other offices have specific additional requirements: candidates for prosecutor must be licensed to practice law; candidates for coroner must be licensed to practice medicine for two years; candidates for engineer must be both licensed surveyors and engineers; and candidates for sheriff must have either a two-year college degree or five years of supervisory experience in law enforcement.

=== Vacancies ===
If a vacancy arises, it is filled by the county central committee of the political party to which the former official belonged, i.e., the Republicans appoint someone to an office held by a Republican and the Democrats to an office held by a Democrat. If an office becomes vacant before the November election in the even-numbered year midway through the term, the appointee must run in a special election for the remainder of the term. If the office becomes vacant after then, the appointment is for the remainder of the term.

=== Board of County Commissioners ===
The Board of County Commissioners is the combined executive and legislative branch of county government but as their control over the independently elected officials is limited, there is effectively no real executive. Though the commissioners receive a full-time salary, most commissioners have full-time occupations on the side and so many boards hire a county administrator to oversee the county's day-to-day affairs. The board also employs a clerk to record its proceedings if it is deemed necessary to have a full-time clerk, otherwise the Auditor is ex officio the clerk. One of the members of the board is named president of the board.

The board of commissioners often create numerous subordinate departments to handle specific services. These vary from county to county; among the most common are departments for building and zoning, health, economic development, water and sewer service, and emergency management.

=== Board of education ===
There is also a county educational service center (previously known as the county board of education) presided over by a board of education, typically numbering five members, elected to staggered four-year terms in non-partisan elections in odd-numbered years. The center supplies services to the individual school districts in the county and exercises some limited control over the class of school districts known as "local school districts." ("City school districts" and "exempted village school districts" are free from any oversight by the county board.) Some counties have combined their educational service centers with other counties'. Counties also have a board of mental retardation and developmental disabilities to educate disabled children. The members of the board are appointed.

== Elections ==
Elections are administered in each county by a four-member board of elections which consists of two Republicans and two Democrats appointed by the Ohio Secretary of State at the recommendation of each county party. The board employs a director, who must be of the opposing political party of the chairman of the board of elections, and a deputy director, who must be of the political party of the chairman of the board.

== County courts ==
Every county has a court of common pleas, which is the court of first instance for felonies and certain high-value civil cases. In many counties there are also municipal courts which operate in a defined territory and handle misdemeanors such as traffic tickets and smaller civil matters. Some counties also have one or more county courts, which handle the same cases as a municipal court but which occur outside the jurisdiction of a municipal court. In counties with large populations, the jurisdiction of the common pleas court may be divided into several specific departments, including a probate court (which handles wills, adoptions, and issues marriage licenses), a juvenile court, or a domestic relations court. All judges in Ohio are elected to six-year terms in non-partisan elections after being nominated in partisan primaries. County judges are elected in even-numbered years, municipal court judges in odd-numbered years.
