= Alberta rural addressing system =

The Alberta rural addressing system was created between 1979 and 1981 in Strathcona County, Alberta to satisfy the demands of Canada Post. It improved rural wayfinding for residents, emergency services, and mail delivery.

== The system ==
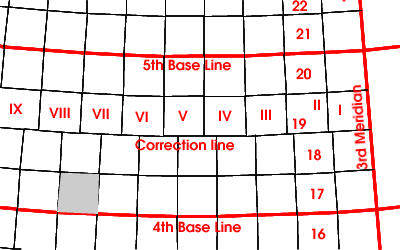
Townships in relation to meridians, baselines and correction lines

During the 1870s, the Dominion Land Survey had parceled much of western Canada into nearly square townships, which are approximately 6 mi (9.7 km) in both the north–south and east–west extents. Townships are designated by their "township number" and "range number", for example, "Township 52, Range 25".

The rural address pinpoints the access to the property near a range road, which runs north–south, or a township road, which runs east–west. Township roads are numbered using the township number, the first road being 0 (zero) with increments increasing every 1 mi (1.6 km). Township 51's first township road would therefore be numbered 510, its second township road (2 miles north) is numbered 512, etc. Range roads are numbered from the east boundary of the range, and increase as one moves west in a similar fashion. Range 21's first range road would therefore be numbered 210, its second numbered 211, etc.

The property address is the access location onto a township road or a range road. Each mile is divided into 40 units that are 132 ft (40 m) wide. These units are odd-numbered from 1 to 79 on the south side of township roads and on the east side of range roads. The opposite side of the roads are even-numbered 2 to 80. An example address of the property on Township Road 512, 1,320 ft (400 m) east of the intersection with Range Road 211, would be 21133 Township Road 512. Multi-lot subdivisions are addressed similarly to apartments in a city, with a street address and a unit number.

== Background ==
By 1979, the growing number of rural residences in Strathcona County, Alberta, had made it too cumbersome for Canada Post to accurately deliver the mail using the existing rural route system. Faced with interrupted mail delivery the county's reeve, JD Morrow, directed a County engineer, Paul Steinhubl, to solve this pressing problem. Earlier in his career, Steinhubl had presented versions of the concept to local authorities in Saskatchewan, but they had been dismissed as irrelevant or too costly. So with the concept already established, Steinhubl was able to present a rural addressing system proposal almost immediately. The simplicity of the concept and its continuous adaptability to all of Alberta and western Canada convinced the Strathcona County Council to endorse the concept. By the end of 1981, the implementation of the rural addressing system was complete. All residences had their addresses and the road signs were installed.

At the Alberta Association of Municipal Districts and Counties annual convention in 1989, a resolution was passed endorsing The Township Road and Range Road Concept. To date, Alberta's rural addressing system continues to be implemented across the province.

== Non-unique addresses ==
Range Roads are numbered westward from prime meridians. The fourth meridian runs along the Alberta-Saskatchewan border, the fifth, at 114° West longitude (Stony Plain, Calgary), and the sixth at 118° (Grande Prairie) This means that there are up to 3 each of lower numbered range roads, and two each of the rest. E.g. Range road 22 west of the fourth, Range road 22 west of the fifth, and Range road 22 west of the 6th meridian. At Edmonton's latitude, the westernmost range road west of the 4th is Range Road 280—the first road in the 28th township block west of the Saskatchewan border. At 6 miles per block, that's 168 miles. This is sufficient so that there isn't local confusion.

Township roads are numbered north from the US Border and are unique, but the numerical part is numbered from the meridians. So instead of there being duplicate roads, there are duplicate numbers on a road.

In common use, either the county or the town where you get mail is appended onto the address. This helps mere humans to have a feel for where the address is.
