= Ohio Department of Transportation =

Transportation agency of the U.S. state of Ohio

Coordinates: 39°57′33″N 83°03′14″W

Department of Transportation
- Emblem of the Ohio Department of Transportation

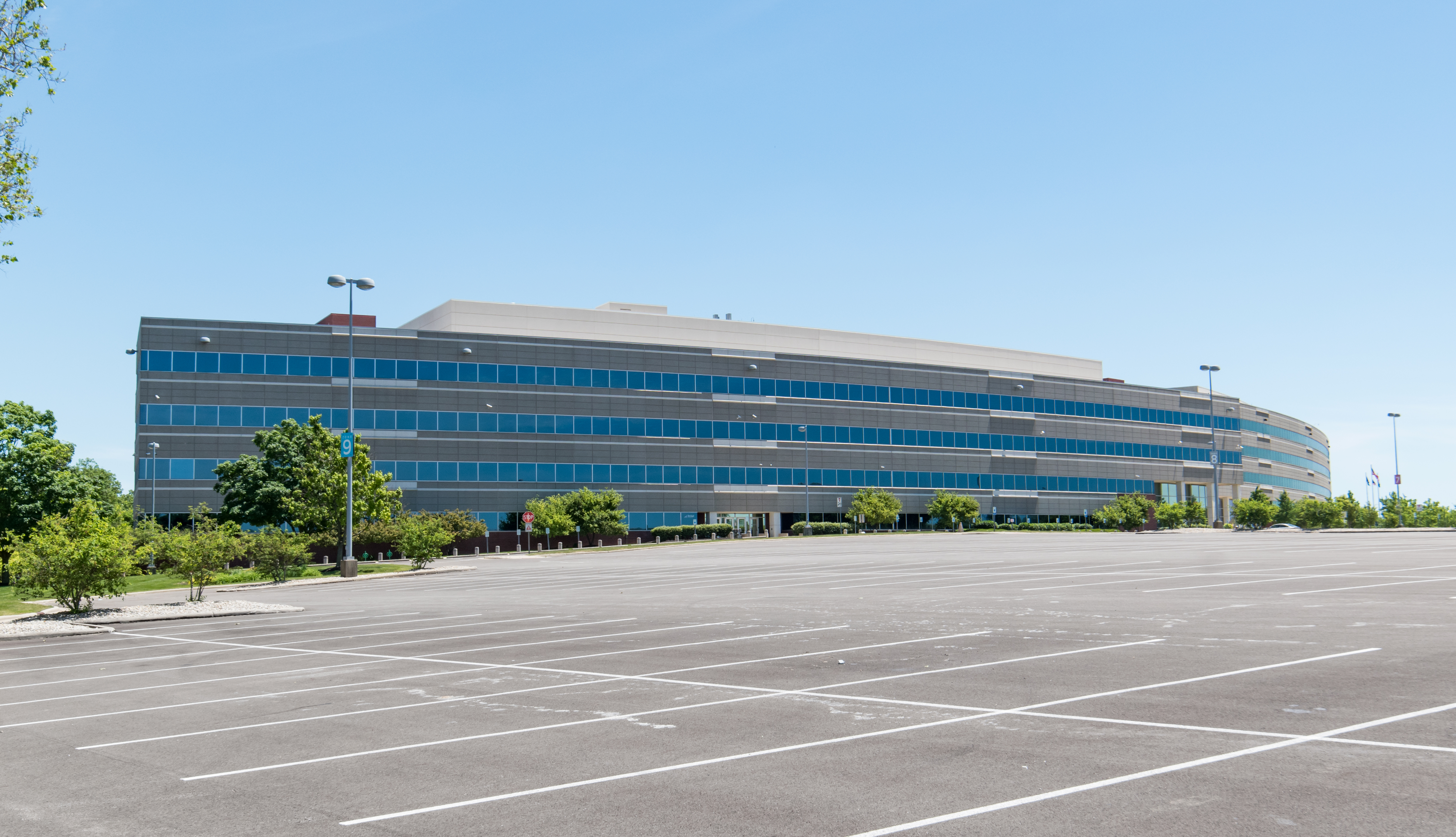
- Headquarters in Columbus

Department overview
- Formed: February 15, 1905; 121 years ago
- Preceding department: Ohio Department of Highways
- Jurisdiction: The state of Ohio
- Headquarters: 1980 West Broad Street, Columbus, Ohio, United States 43223
- Employees: 5,000 (2023)
- Annual budget: $2.898 billion US$ (2007)
- Department executive: Pamela Boratyn, Director
- Website: transportation.ohio.gov

The Ohio Department of Transportation (ODOT; /ˈoʊ.dɒt/) is the administrative department of the Ohio state government responsible for developing and maintaining all state and U.S. roadways outside of municipalities and all Interstates except the Ohio Turnpike. In addition to highways, the department also helps develop public transportation and public aviation programs. ODOT is headquartered in Columbus, Ohio. Formerly, under the direction of Michael Massa, ODOT initiated a series of interstate-based Travel Information Centers, which were later transferred to local partners. The Director of Transportation is part of the Governor's Cabinet.

ODOT has divided the state into 12 regional districts to facilitate development. Each district is responsible for the planning, design, construction, and maintenance of the state and federal highways in its region. The department employs nearly 5,000 people and has an annual budget approaching $3 billion. It celebrated its 100th anniversary in 2005 and its 35th as the Ohio Department of Transportation in 2007.

== History ==
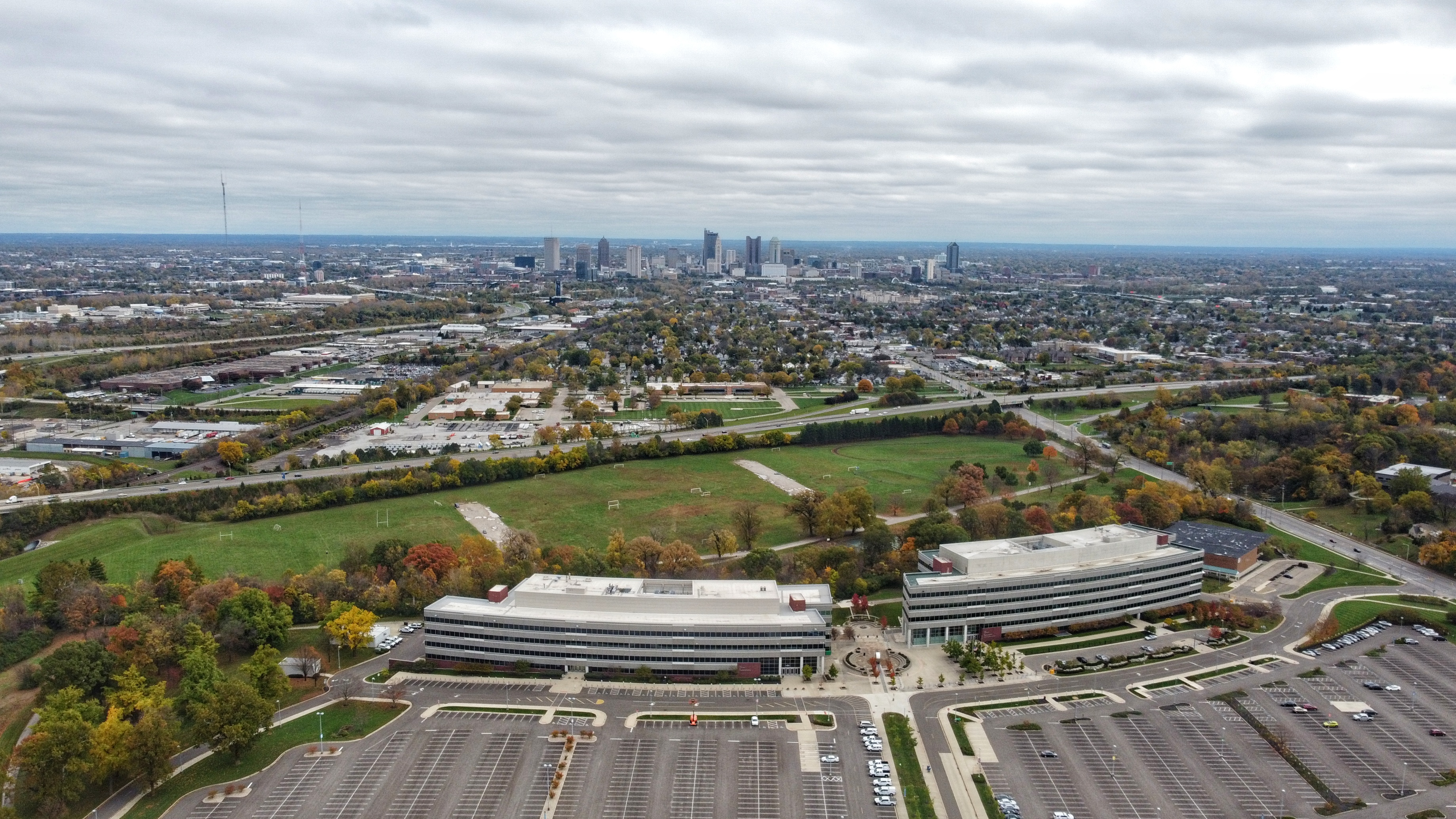
The ODOT and ODPS campus in Columbus's Hilltop neighborhood

=== Origins ===
The "Ohio Department of Highways" began operations on February 15, 1905. The original office consisted of four employees and an annual budget of $10,000. Its mission was to study the state roads and the science of road construction. The Department of Highways created the first Ohio State Highway Patrol in an attempt to reduce the number of automobile-related fatalities in 1933. By the end of the year, the first patrolmen were on duty.

=== Interstate highway era ===
On June 29, 1956, President Dwight D. Eisenhower signed the Federal Aid Highway Act of 1956 into law, designating highways for each state to build with federal assistance to create the modern interstate highway system. One year later, in 1957, Ohio's Department of Highways officially began construction on the 1,500 miles (2,400 km) of the interstate system designated for Ohio in the Federal-Aid Highway Act. After one year of interstate construction, Ohio was spending more on roadway construction than New York or California, and by 1962 had 684 miles (1,101 km) of interstates open. By the end of the decade, Ohio hit a milestone, with over 1,000 miles (1,600 km) completed.

In 1965 the federal government began to allow new federal funds to be spent on highway beautification projects. The Ohio Department of Highways took a leading role in this national initiative, creating a new Design Services Division to oversee rest areas and landscaping along thousands of miles of state and interstate roadways in Ohio. To consolidate multiple modes of transportation under one agency, the Ohio Department of Highways officially became the Ohio Department of Transportation in September 1972. In 1984, the department instituted its first network of tourist information centers at interstate entry points throughout Ohio. Two more milestones were reached during this period, with the full outer belt (Interstate 270) being completed around Columbus in 1975, as well as Interstate 70 traveling east to west through the heart of Ohio in 1976.

=== Downsizing ===
In 1995 ODOT began efforts to become more efficient as well as be more customer-friendly. At the time, ODOT employed 7,800 employees. By 2000 the total number of employees had been reduced to 6,031, a 22.6% decrease in 5 years, and further reduced to 5,000 by 2023. This move reduced the increase in payroll expenditures to 0.78% per year. In addition, non-payroll budgets were limited to a 2% annual increase since 1995. Since the Ohio Department of Transportation is managed by separate districts, district budgets were redesigned to allow any operational efficiencies to remain within the district. This allowed each district to reinvest into their roads and bridges, provided they can spend less than their budget. A comprehensive set of measures and objectives have been adopted to oversee each district's performance.

Since downsizing, ODOT has become more efficient in most areas of operation. Between 1997 and 2004, deficiencies were reduced significantly. Bridge structural deficiencies were reduced by 74%, pavement deficiencies were reduced by 79%, and guardrail deficiencies were reduced by 70%. In addition, snow and ice removal efforts were improved.

=== Jobs and Progress plan ===
On August 5, 2003, Governor Bob Taft unveiled his 10‑year, $5 billion "Jobs and Progress plan", developed to supply $500 million annually to ODOT for new construction and revitalization projects designed to ease freeway congestion, improve road safety, and connect rural Ohio. The plan is also estimated to create over 4,000 highway construction jobs. One month later, ODOT completed Interstate 670 in Columbus, marking the completion of the original interstate highway plan in Ohio.

== Studies and projects ==
Ohio's interstate highway system is approaching 50 years old, and many highways are reaching the end of their designed lives. Commercial truck traffic alone had grown 90% in the last quarter-century and is estimated to grow another 60% by 2020. This forced ODOT to create a statewide plan to address congestion issues as well as the repair of aging interstate highways. ODOT currently manages 17 major studies or projects, ranging from bridge construction to intersection redesign. Major projects generally involve creating greater allowances for traffic flow and easing congestion.

=== Cleveland Urban Core projects ===
In August 2000, ODOT began the Cleveland Innerbelt Study to develop a comprehensive strategy to rebuild portions of Interstate 71, Interstate 77, and Interstate 90 into downtown Cleveland. The focus of the project is reducing inner-city congestion, replacing or repairing older sections of the freeway system, and improving the safety of the system. Of particular interest to ODOT is the safety of the Cleveland Innerbelt and Dead Man's Curve, both of which experience an accident rate higher than the national average. In addition, ODOT plans to construct a new single-tower cable-stayed bridge north of the current bridge for westbound traffic on Interstate 90 over the Cuyahoga River Valley.

Construction was originally planned for 2009, though resistance from some citizens in the community has put the entire project in question. Complaints have been raised over the plan to build the new bridge north of the current span over the Cuyahoga River, mostly due to the effect the construction would have on day-to-day life and the loss of historical buildings and landmarks. In addition, complaints have been raised about the cost of the project, which has been raised from the original $800 million to $1.5 billion. While the cost of the plan is mostly the construction of two new bridges over fifteen years, many in the community feel the rehabilitation of the existing bridges would be more cost-effective. An unofficial estimate for bridge rehabilitation puts the cost at $268 million, or $366 million for the entire innerbelt project.

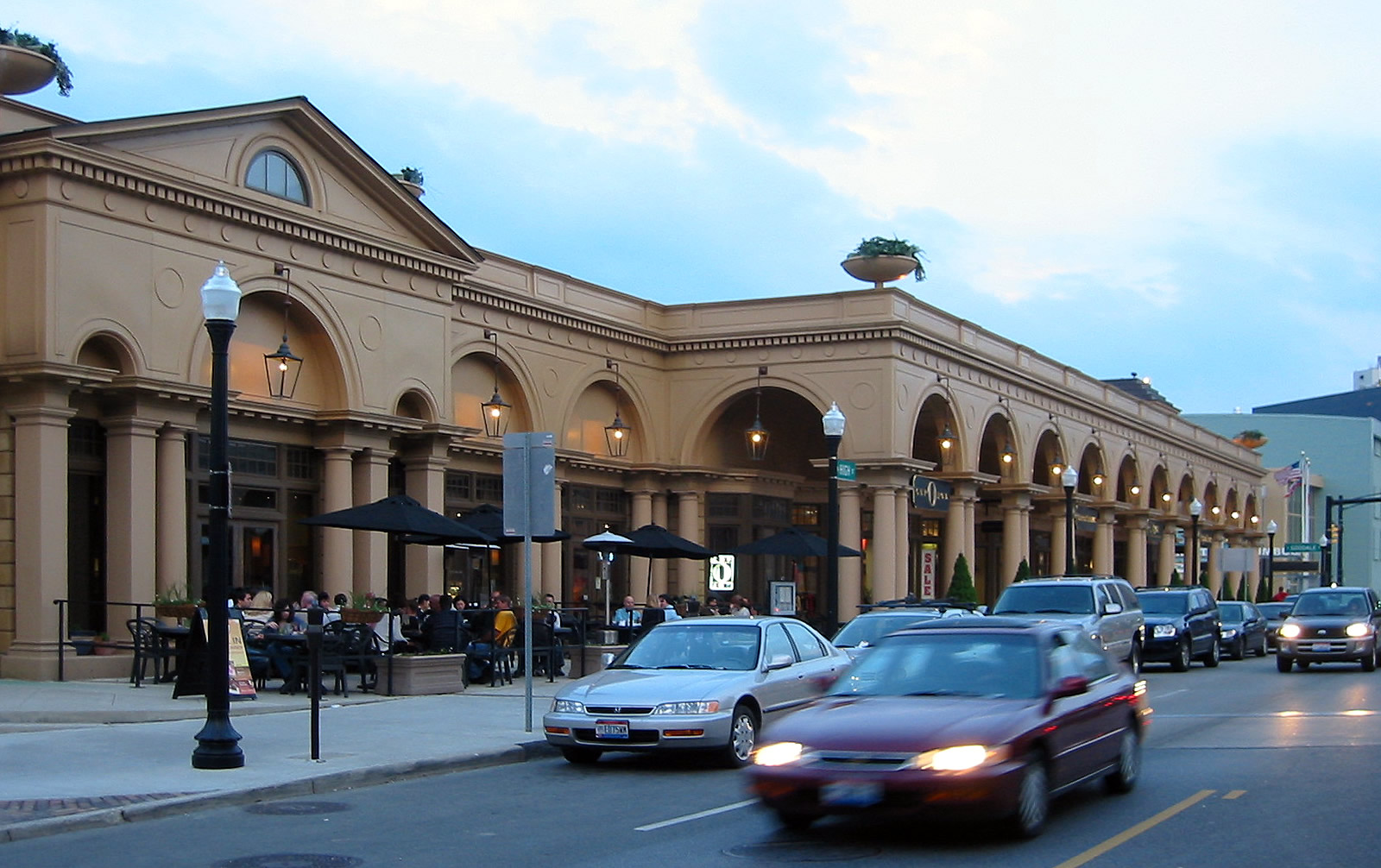
High Street passing over I-670 in Columbus. I-670 passes directly under this extended bridge.

=== Dayton area projects ===
Interstate 75 through Downtown Dayton was upgraded and modernized over ten years. Construction included widening Interstate 75 from Neva Drive through U.S. 35 in Dayton to three through lanes as well as added lanes for exiting. Also, a new interchange at Route 4 and Interstate 75 was constructed as part of the project. As part of another phase in the project, ODOT modified the U.S. 35 interchange to provide three continuous lanes in each direction on I‑75. All of the phases of this construction will be done at an estimated cost of $533 million. Construction of the last phase was completed in 2016.

On February 26, 2009, the state of Ohio awarded a contract for $22 million to construct an interchange at Austin Boulevard and Interstate 75 in Springboro, Ohio, in southern Montgomery County. Construction on the interchange began in April 2009 and was completed in July 2010. As part of the project, ODOT reconstructed the intersection of SR 741 and Miamisburg-Springboro Pike by widening lanes and adding a two-leg Displaced Left Turn (DLT) continuous flow intersection.

=== Columbus Crossroads Project ===
Another large-scale project ODOT is spearheading is the I‑70/I‑71 South Innerbelt Corridor Project, a multifaceted plan to reduce congestion in downtown Columbus along with the convergence of Interstate 70 and Interstate 71. Commonly known as "the downtown split", the region regularly experiences heavy traffic and is the site of 27% of all traffic accidents along I‑70 and I‑71 in Franklin County. To reduce traffic and accidents, as well as remove the confusion of getting on or off the freeway, the downtown split project will add lanes to the freeway in both directions, widen Mound and Fulton streets, and convert them to one-way, collector/distributor streets, and move the current on/off-ramps to facilitate better traffic flow. The project cost around $800 million and began in 2011.

==== Freeway caps ====
In addition to freeway construction, ODOT, along with the Mid-Ohio Regional Planning Commission (MORPC), and the city of Columbus are discussing the possibility of several freeway caps over portions of I-70 and I-71. These caps, similar to the one built on High Street over I-670, would be widened overpasses, creating a seamless transition between neighborhoods by adding businesses or parks to either side of the current overpass. While this will add considerable cost to the project, it is hoped that the freeway caps will link neighborhoods that were divided when the interstate highway system was put in. Twelve overpasses were originally looked at for freeway caps, though the list has been narrowed to six due to budget constraints. Each cap would cost anywhere between $2 million and $12 million depending on the complexity, and a total of $53 million to $62 million could be added to the project if all six are built. The Ohio Department of Transportation has pledged $10 million toward caps, $37 million for streetscape improvements in total, and the MORPC has pledged another $12 million for the caps. With the caps and other streetscape improvements added to the project, the total project cost is expected to reach $1 billion.

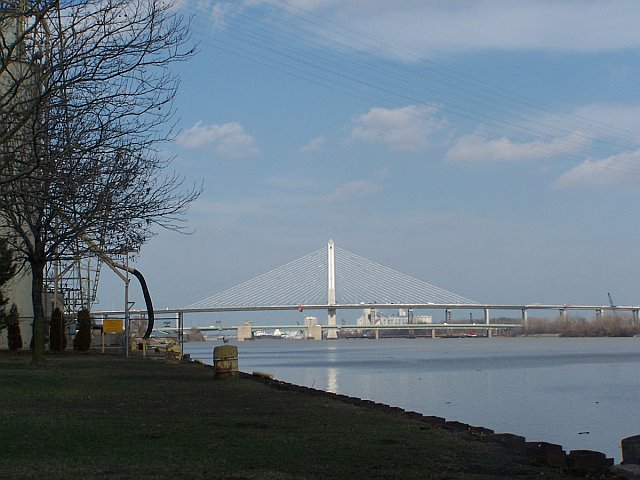
The Veterans' Glass City Skyway replaced the Craig Memorial Bridge when it opened in 2007.

=== Veterans' Glass City Skyway ===
In March 2002, ODOT began the largest single project in its history. Needing a replacement for the outdated Craig Memorial Bridge in Toledo, the department initiated the Veterans' Glass City Skyway project, with an estimated price tag of $234 million. The six-lane, single-tower cable-stayed bridge design includes glass panels along with all four faces of the tower and LEDs installed within, allowing for customizable lighting effects on the bridge. The original completion date was for May 2006, but the project was struck with a sixteen-month-long delay after an accident killed four workers on February 16, 2004. This delayed the initial opening of the skyway until June 24, 2007.

=== Northeast Expressway Transformation ===
The Northeast Expressway Transformation (NExT) project, which began on June 14, 2004, marked another significant undertaking by ODOT as the largest single highway project ever in central Ohio. It included rebuilding the State Route 161 interchanges at Interstate 270 and Sunbury Road, including 17 bridges, 18 ramps, and five miles (8 km) of the highway. The original intersections at I-270 and Sunbury Road were designed to handle 58,000 and 21,000 vehicles per day, respectively, but daily loads had surpassed 135,000 at I-270 and 90,000 at Sunbury Road. By 2020 loads are estimated to be approaching 200,000 vehicles per day at both interchanges. To meet and exceed current traffic needs, the project replaced three of the four cloverleaf ramps at I-270 with two flyover ramps and one "fly under" tunnel, reconfigured the Sunbury Road exit into a modified single-point urban interchange (SPUI), and add through lanes for both I-270 and SR-161. The project was completed in the fall of 2008.

=== Other studies/projects ===
Other studies include the Toledo I-75/I-475 Interchange Study, the North Central Outerbelt Study (I-270), the Akron Central Interchange Project (I-76). and the U.S. 35 Corridor Major Investment Study (MIS).

== Department management ==
The Ohio Department of Transportation currently operates the seventh-largest highway system in the United States and the sixth-largest interstate system measured by total lane-miles. These highways support the fifth-greatest traffic volume by total vehicle miles, the third-greatest value of commercial freight, and contain the second-largest inventory of bridges in the nation as well. ODOT maintains approximately 49,000 lane-miles of highway system statewide. Included with these highways are over 15,000 bridges and culverts, 6,200 on/off ramps, 5,000 stop signs, 3,400 intersections, and 3,100 miles (5,000 km) of guardrail.

(For a complete list of all roads maintained by ODOT, see List of numbered highways in Ohio.)

=== Budget ===
The 2006/2007 operating budget for the department is forecast at $2.898 billion, with $753 million going towards general operating expenditures and $724 million for new programs funded by the Jobs and Progress Plan. Total revenue is expected to be $1.089 billion from the state and $1.247 billion from the federal government, equaling $2.336 billion. The remainder of the funds is to come from state and federal bonds. Though ODOT currently plans on a 1% yearly growth in overall revenue through 2015, total expenditures are expected to see no growth through the same period. This is due in large part because the funding from the Jobs and Progress plan will even out to $500 million after 2009.

=== Bridge inspection ===
The department runs an annual bridge inspection program as mandated by state law. Statewide, Ohio has 10,348 bridges owned by the state. To maintain all of its bridges, ODOT dedicates a significant portion of its budget to bridge construction and maintenance. For 2008, the department has allocated $239 million toward bridges, with an additional $91 million going towards assisting the bridge projects of counties and cities. The Ohio Department of Transportation is also responsible for twelve under-deck truss bridges, the same construction type as the bridge that collapsed in Minnesota on August 1, 2007. Of these, six are on the interstate highway system, and four of those are in some stage of replacement.

=== District management ===
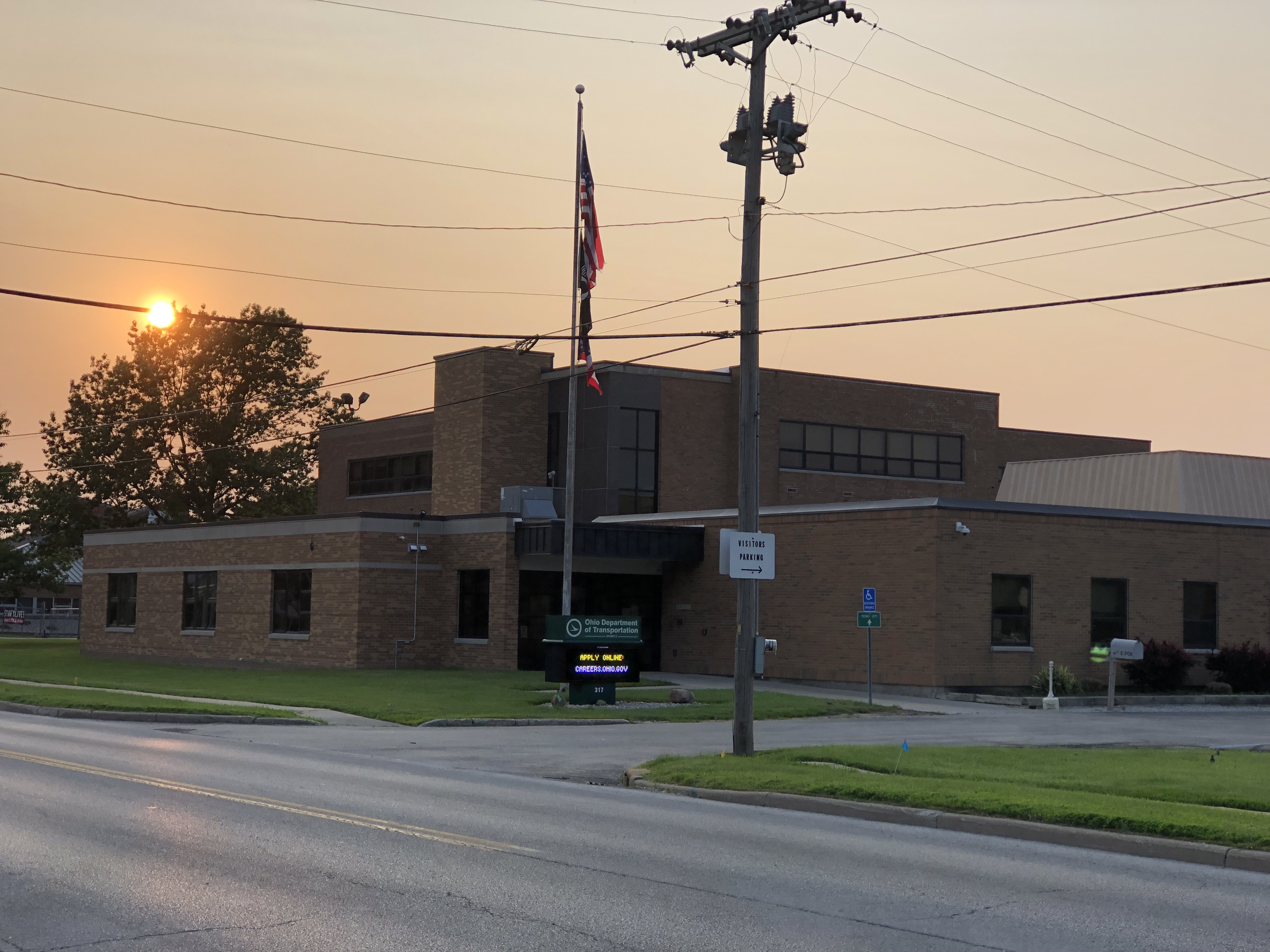
The District 2 office.

All 12 districts of the Ohio Department of Transportation are divided into four departments that manage the many facets of state transportation. The planning and programs department is responsible for monitoring the district work program, monitoring department adherence to environmental regulations, ensuring community involvement in transportation decisions, and using budget allocations to select improvement projects. In addition, the department schedules the time frame for improvements and secures the funding needed to design and construct improvements. The production department manages surveying, project and bridge design, and traffic. The department also oversees contracting consultants and coordinating right-of-way and utilities for projects. The principal responsibilities of the highway management department are road maintenance and snow and ice removal. Besides these, the department also manages traffic signals, materials testing, bridge inspection, construction contracts, road signs, and highway striping. The final department making up each district of the Ohio Department of Transportation is business and human services. This department is responsible for worker safety programs, labor contract management, personnel administration, accounting, information technology, budget and purchasing management, the operation and maintenance of district-wide facilities.

== Highway safety ==
ODOT measures the traffic volumes on its roadways via automated traffic recorders (ATRs), time-lapse videos, and piezometric tube counters and then generates a Traffic Survey Report. The majority of sensors exist within the major cities, though more are planned for installation throughout the state. The department also partners with the Ohio Department of Public Safety to monitor traffic-related crashes. Traffic crash reports are entered into a database that is shared by both departments. This Base Transportation Reporting System (BTRS) allows ODOT to review the number, frequency, and severity of accidents that occur on its system. Traffic engineering is then used to establish safety threshold numbers and signal areas of concern for traffic safety.

=== Statewide Traffic Management Center ===
The Ohio Department of Transportation currently operates a statewide traffic management center to monitor the highways in the State from a centralized location in Columbus. Dedicated operators monitor each of the major metro areas 24/7 using cameras and speed sensors. The operators post any incidents to OHGO.com as well as the message boards located on the highways. The Traffic Management Center is also responsible for operating the I-90 Variable Speed Corridor in Lake County, as well as the I-670 SmartLane in Columbus.

=== Snow and ice safety ===
The Ohio Department of Transportation currently has access to 1,536 snowplows to help maintain good road conditions during winter months and has approximately 2,500 employees available each season for snow and ice removal. In addition to trucks, the department also has 650,000 tons of salt stored at 220 locations statewide. While ODOT spends an average of $24 million per year for winter operations, though most years can use anywhere from 300,000 to 900,000 tons of salt per year. ODOT now manages a decentralized snow and ice program, giving districts, counties, and snowplow operators a set of guidelines to follow, which can be modified to best assist the area. In prior years, the department issued twelve pages of directives that mandated when and where plows are to be used. This system proved to be inefficient, which helped to bring the new system about.

In 2000 ODOT began installing pavement sensors and Global Positioning System (GPS) tracking devices, as well as generating computer-modeled snowplow routes to enhance its snow and ice removal program. The pavement sensors relay valuable information such as pavement and air temperature, precipitation accumulation, and wind speed. By identifying and reporting weather conditions on the highway, the sensors help ODOT prioritize its response and more efficiently clear the roads. Several pavement sensors currently exist on highways around the state. Data from these sensors is transferred to ODOT's district offices and entered into the Road and Weather Information System (RWIS) on the ODOT website. Motorists can track winter weather conditions by accessing RWIS on the internet. RWIS also lists winter weather advisories, snow warnings, and highway closures. The information is kept current and is available 24 hours per day.

Computer modeling software is also used to plan plow routes for each county. Data on equipment capabilities, personnel resources, facility locations, and highway types are entered into the system. Highway layouts and the locations of available plows and salt stores are then examined to determine the most effective routes for snowplows and salt spreading equipment. Global Positioning System (GPS) devices were also installed on ODOT vehicles to help monitor the locations of ODOT equipment. This allows the department to track the exact location of snow removal equipment and determine which routes have already been serviced.

== See also ==
- DriveOhio
- Ohio Manual of Uniform Traffic Control Devices
