= Ohio Manual of Uniform Traffic Control Devices =

State highway manual

- Cover of the 2012 edition, the latest published to date
- Authors: Ohio Department of Transportation
- Language: English
- Publisher: Ohio Department of Transportation
- Publication date: May 1924; 102 years ago
- Publication place: United States
- OCLC: 289826
- Text: Ohio Manual of Uniform Traffic Control Devices online

The Ohio Manual of Uniform Traffic Control Devices (abbreviated OMUTCD) is the standard for traffic signs, road surface markings, and traffic signals in the U.S. state of Ohio. It is developed by the Ohio Department of Transportation's Office of Roadway Engineering "in substantial conformance to" the national Manual on Uniform Traffic Control Devices developed by the Federal Highway Administration. The first edition of the OMUTCD was published in 1924; the most recent edition was published in 2012. Ohio is one of ten states that publish their own editions of the MUTCD.

The OMUTCD defines the content and placement of traffic signs. Design specifications are detailed in a separate document, the Sign Designs & Markings Manual (SDMM), which mirrors the national Standard Highway Signs and Markings (SHSM) document. A third document, the Traffic Engineering Manual (TEM), codifies ODOT's traffic engineering best practices, which local jurisdictions are encouraged to use as a reference. The OMUTCD includes references to both documents. The OMUTCD is a large document on its own, measuring about 2 inches (51 mm) thick.

== History ==
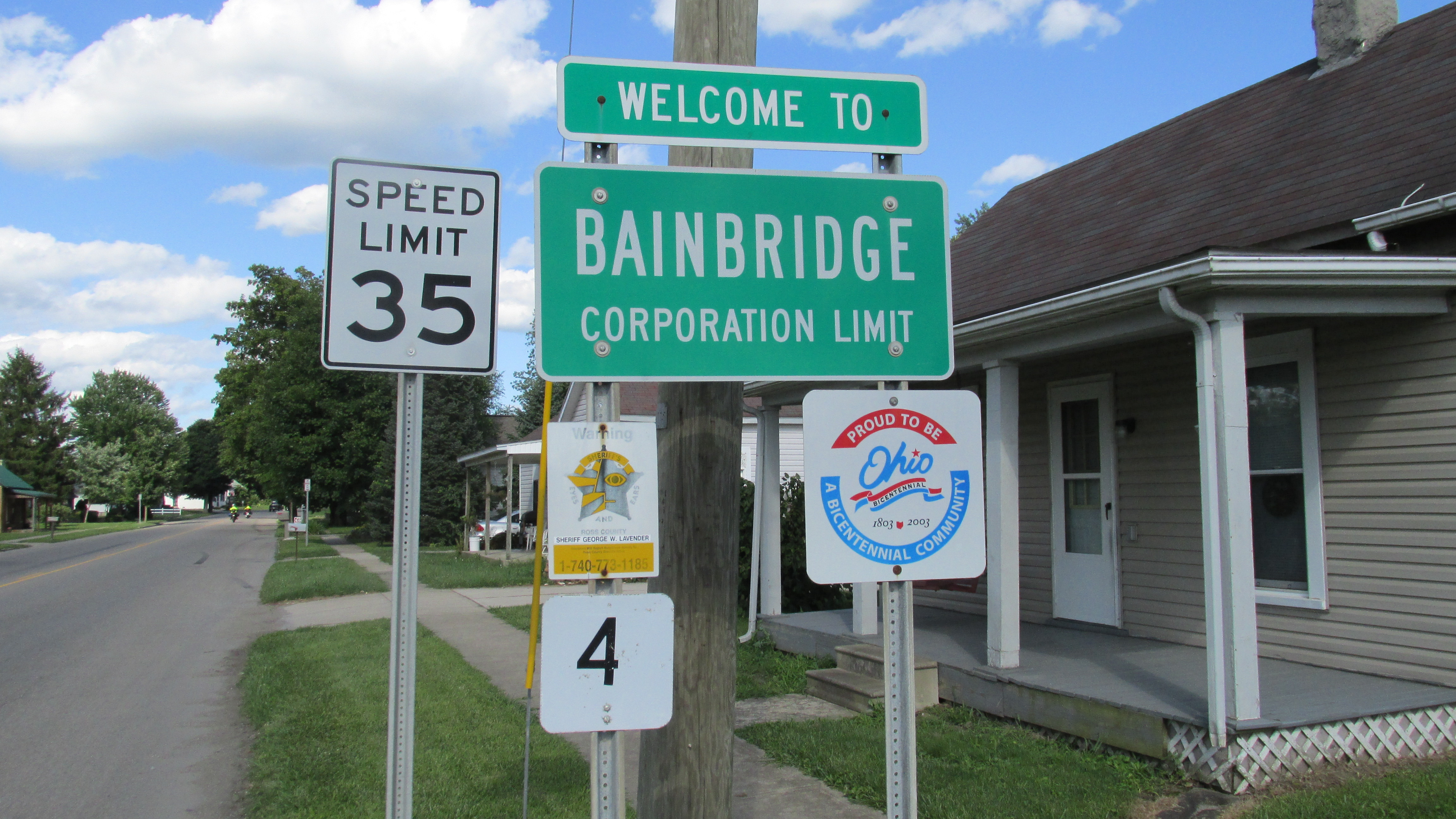
Information and reference location signs specific to the OMUTCD

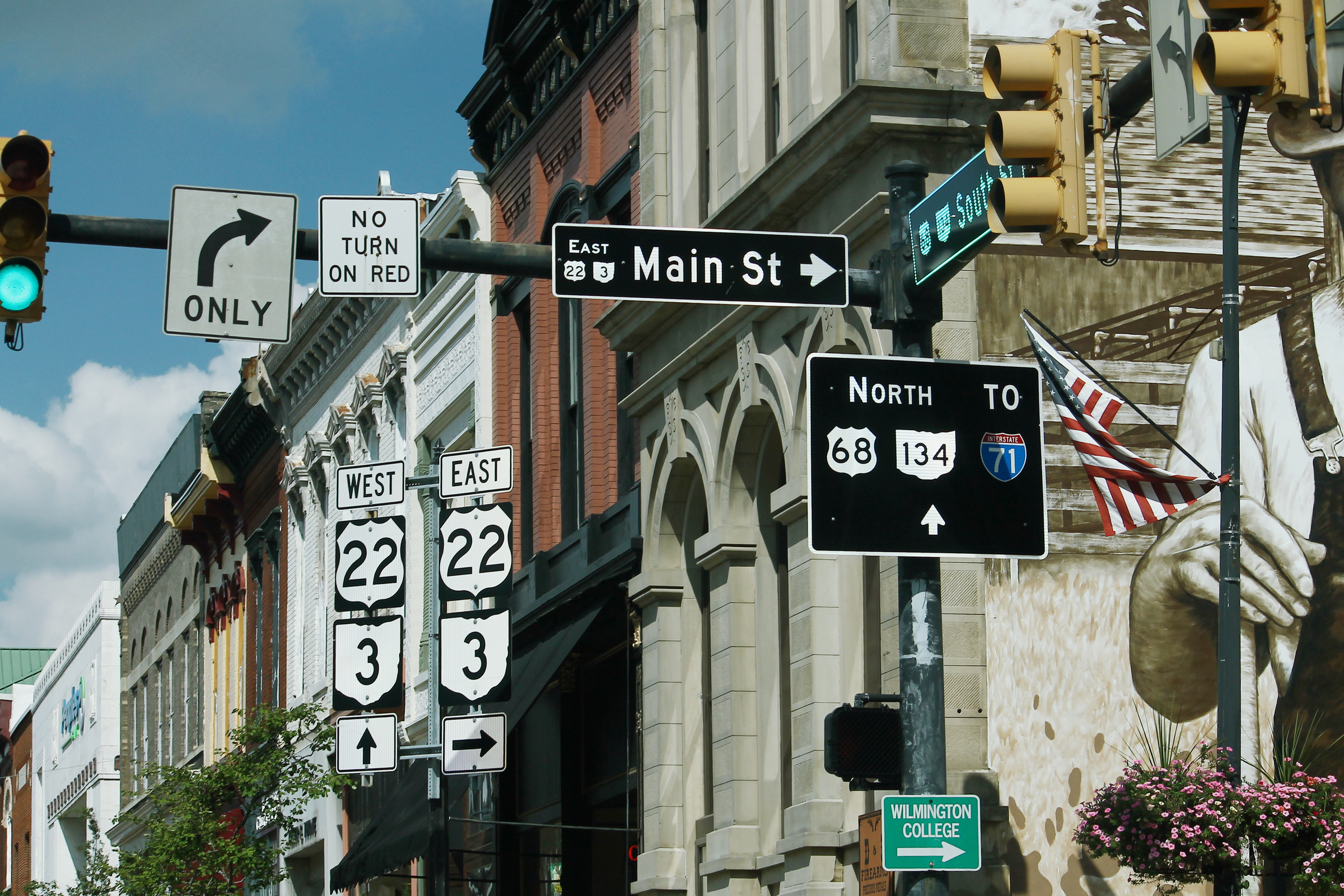
Directional signs and route markers specific to the OMUTCD

In May 1924, the Ohio Department of Highways published Ohio's first sign standard, the Manual of Standard Signs and Markers. The American Association of State Highway Officials would publish the first national Manual and Specifications for the Manufacture, Display, and Erection of U.S. Standard Road Markers and Signs over two years later. In July 1934, Ohio's manual was expanded and renamed to the Manual of Standard Signs, Markers, and Pavement Marking. In 1943, the document was again renamed to the Ohio Manual of Uniform Traffic Control Devices for Streets and Highways, with further editions in 1952 and 1956.

From 1962 to 1999, the Department of Highways (ODH), later the Ohio Department of Transportation (ODOT), published piecemeal revisions to the OMUTCD. The 1962, 1963, 1972, and 1976 editions and their revisions were approved by the Director of Transportation in the Director's Journal, sometimes with overlap between two manual editions. A 1965 law strengthened the MUTCD's legal authority by prohibiting the sale, purchase, or manufacture of noncompliant signs and signals.

Further editions were published in 2003, 2005, and 2012 under a shortened title, Ohio Manual of Uniform Traffic Control Devices. The 2012 edition conforms to the 2009 MUTCD. The SDMM has been revised several times since the 2012 OMUTCD, most recently on July 21, 2023 (as of July 2023).

In 2026, ODOT replaced the OMUTCD with a state supplement to the federal MUTCD; however, according to the supplement, "[t]he 'Ohio Supplement and the Manual on Uniform Traffic Control Devices (MUTCD)' is the 'Ohio Manual on Uniform Traffic Control Devices (OMUTCD)'. The two terms are intended to be used interchangeably".

At times, changes to the MUTCD have required corresponding changes in Ohio state law before the OMUTCD can be updated to conform with it.

== Legal authority ==
Ohio Revised Code section 4511.09 provides for ODOT to adopt a state-specific edition of the MUTCD. Section 4511.11 legally requires all traffic control devices to conform to these standards on roads open to public travel. Therefore, the manual is also used by county, township, and municipal highway departments, as well as by private construction firms, to ensure that the traffic control devices they use conform to the state standard. Some signs specific to the OMUTCD are featured in the Digest of Ohio Motor Vehicle Laws, a driver's education handbook published in three languages by the Ohio Bureau of Motor Vehicles.

== Contents ==
The "Buckeye Crossbuck", an experimental variation of the standard railroad crossbuck (R15-1), was briefly included in the OMUTCD.

The OMUTCD and SDMM are organized similarly to the MUTCD and SHSM, respectively. Each standard sign or plaque in the SDMM is assigned an alphanumeric designation and organized according to the same series found in the SHSM. A sign designation follows the same format as in the national SHSM; however, the sign designation for a state-specific sign includes an "H" before the sign number.

The OMUTCD contains many signs specific to Ohio law or infrastructure, such as a township limit sign, a route marker for the Ohio Turnpike, a weight limit sign enumerating Ohio's allowed truck configurations, a height limit sign placed above the knee braces of a covered bridge, and a logo panel for the State Farm Safety Patrol program. It also contains signs specific to ODOT operations, such as at rest areas and district headquarters. Some OMUTCD signs are variants or clarifications of signs that appear in the MUTCD, such as a series of lane use control signs for every combination of through and turn lanes up to six lanes, or a standardized "Signal Under Study for Removal" sign that the MUTCD only refers to in passing.

Signs originally published as part of the OMUTCD are sometimes incorporated into the national MUTCD, such as the signs for golf cart (W11-11) and horse-drawn carriage crossings (W11-14). Others, like the red-colored "Buckeye Crossbuck" (R15-1) and its accompanying "Crossbuck Shield" (R15-9), a plate with bent sides intended to reflect the light of an oncoming train, were eventually discontinued and removed from the OMUTCD.

Some common signs unique to the OMUTCD

Vehicles Over 4 Tons Empty / Non Com Buses (R2-H2a)

U-Turn Permitted Symbol Sign (R3-H4b)

Lane Use Control Sign (L-X-T-T-TR) (R3-H8dt)

No Parking Fire Lane / (arrow) (R7-H10)

Do Not Block Driveway (R10-H7a)

Weight Limit (R12-H5)

Weight Limit Reduced 20% Effective... (R12-H17)

Limited Access Highway Notice Sign (R26-H1)

State Law / Phones Down While Driving (R28-H1)

Watch for Stopped Traffic (W3-H4b)

Center Lanes Merge (W4-H1a)

Cemetery Entrance (W11-H13)

(Buggy symbol) Using Roadway Ahead (W11-H14a)

Side Low Clearance / (arrow) (W12-H3R)

State Route Shield (2 digits) (M1-5-2)

Township Route Marker (M1-H6b)

Lake Erie Circle Tour Symbol Sign (M8-H2)

Ohio Byway Symbol sign (M8-H3)

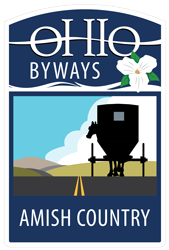
Amish Country Scenic Byway (M8-H4a)

Enter Corp (I-H2b)

Township Limit Sign (I-H2e)

Scenic River (I-H3b)

Entering Watershed (I-H3d)

County or Township / Road Name (D3-H6b)

This Roadside Rest Area is Maintained by Ohio... (D5-H18)
