= County commission =

Form of local government

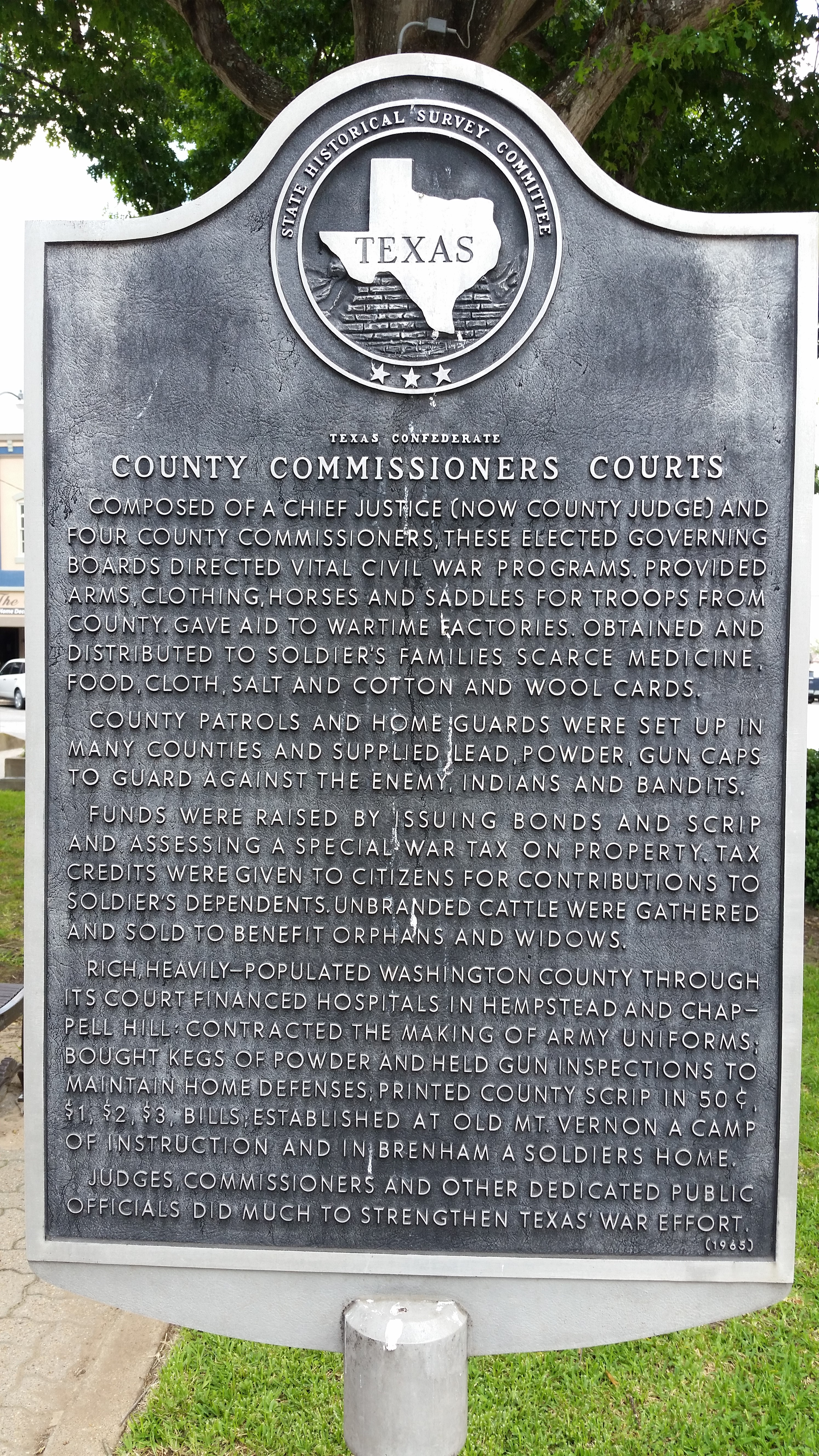
County Commission Texas historical marker in Brenham, Texas

A county commission is a group of elected officials (county commissioners) collectively charged with administering the county government in most states of the United States. Various states also refer to such bodies as board of county commissioners, county board of supervisors, or county council, among other terms; however, the same term being used in different states or jurisdictions does not necessarily mean they share the same structure, or that bodies with different names have substantially different structures. County commissions or boards most commonly have three or five members, but structures vary among states and jurisdictions.

Similar to a city council, a county commission or board may have legislative, executive, and quasi-judicial powers. A commission typically levies local taxes and administers or oversees county governmental services such as correctional institutions, courts, public health oversight, property registration, building code enforcement, and public works (e.g. road maintenance). In some urban areas counties have relatively less power as tighter local governmental control is established in municipalities, though in many more rural areas, the county commission retains more control, and even in some urbanized areas, may be responsible for significant government services.

Counties are administrative divisions of a state, so depending on the state, they implement and, as necessary, refine the local application of state law and public policy, while cities, as municipal corporations, produce and implement their own local laws and public policy (subject to the overriding authority of state law).

In some jurisdictions there may be distinct differences between a county commission and other similarly titled bodies. For example, a county council may differ from a county commission by containing more members or by having a council-manager form of government. In Indiana, every county, except Marion County which is consolidated with the city of Indianapolis, has both a county commission and a county council, with the county commission having administrative authority and the county council being responsible for fiscal matters. In some counties within Georgia a sole commissioner holds the authority of the commission.

== Legislative powers ==
Commissions or boards may pass and repeal laws, generally called ordinances. Depending on the state, and the subject matter of the law, these laws may apply to the entire county or to only unincorporated areas not located within the jurisdiction of a city. The board is also responsible for approving the county budget. County governments may collect state taxes and, in some states, they may also levy taxes, such as property or sales tax.

A county's powers may be defined by state law or by a county charter (home rule).

== Executive powers ==
Commissions or boards oversee county departments. Generally, this is done under the aegis of an elected county executive or appointed county administrator. The power of the executive to act independently depends on the county charter. The administrator or executive usually has the authority over the day-to-day operations of the county's departments. Many commissions or boards independently appoint department heads, while other boards delegate that authority to the administrator or executive. Some department heads, like the sheriff or district attorney, may be elected separately by the electorate; however, the board still controls these departments' budgets.

In the City and County of San Francisco, a consolidated city-county government, the Board of Supervisors does dual duty as a county board of control and a city council, and the mayor is simultaneously city head of government and county executive.

As of 2017, 696 counties have a separately elected county executive, including all counties in Texas, Arkansas, Tennessee, Kentucky, Hawaii, and Alaska.

== Quasi-judicial powers ==
In some states, the board is the final arbiter of decisions made by commissions underneath a board. This often involves land use planning issues.

== History ==
William Penn, colonial founder of Pennsylvania originated the system of county commissions in the United States. On February 28, 1681, King Charles II of England granted a charter for a proprietary colony to William Penn to repay a debt of £16,000 (around £2,100,000 in 2008 currency, adjusting for retail inflation) owed to William's father, Admiral William Penn. This was one of the largest land grants to one individual ever made in history. Penn established a local colonial government with two innovations that were copied by other colonies in the British America: the county commission, and freedom of religious conviction.

As local governments were established on the frontier, the growth of township governments provided some services more efficiently to rural areas than the county government. These townships were led by an elected leader sometimes called a supervisor. Several states replaced the directly elected county commission with a representative system of the supervisors of the townships, known as the board of supervisors. Some western states started using this title for their county boards even when they are directly elected from electoral districts rather than separate administrative units.

In some states, including Michigan and New York, county governing boards were composed of township (Michigan) or town (New York) supervisors, who are the chief elected officials of each civil township. Boards of Supervisors were originally composed of the various town/township supervisors from across the county. This system gave every township one vote on the county board regardless of its population, resulting in less populous townships having influence in decision-making that was disproportionate to their populations.

Both Michigan and New York changed how they elected county boards by dividing counties into single member districts, drawn so that each district has more or less the same sized population or with each township's vote weighted by population, under order from the Warren Court (see Reynolds v. Sims). In Michigan, the new board model was implemented in 1968. The name "Board of Supervisors" was changed to "Board of Commissioners" in 1970 to avoid confusion with township government (where the term "Supervisor" was still used). In New York, the new boards were called "county legislatures" (and their members, "county legislators"), but not every county has adopted this system. Those that retained the old boards of supervisors after the 1960s assigned each member a proportional vote based on the population represented.

New Jersey previously referred to county commissioners as freeholders, but its practice ended in 2021.

As counties have grown, some have changed their governmental structures, such as by expanding from three members to five.

== County governmental bodies by state ==
| State | County board title | Notes |
|---|---|---|
| Alabama | County Commission | |
| Alaska | Borough Assembly | Much of the state (known as the Unorganized Borough) lacks any county-level government. |
| Arizona | Board of Supervisors | |
| Arkansas | Quorum Court | |
| California | Board of Supervisors | |
| Colorado | Board of County Commissioners | |
| Connecticut | County Commission | Abolished in 1961; Connecticut's counties now exist only for historic convention and statistical reporting. |
| Delaware | County Council | |
| Florida | Board of County Commissioners | |
| Georgia | County Commission | Some counties have a commission of one member, known as a sole commissioner |
| Hawaii | County Council | |
| Idaho | Board of Commissioners | |
| Illinois | Board of Commissioners Board of Supervisors | |
| Indiana | Board of County Commissioners | |
| Iowa | Board of Supervisors | |
| Kansas | Board of County Commissioners | |
| Kentucky | Fiscal Court | |
| Louisiana | Police Jury | |
| Maine | Board of County Commissioners | |
| Maryland | Board of County Commissioners | |
| Massachusetts | Board of County Commissioners | |
| Michigan | Board of Commissioners | |
| Minnesota | Board of Commissioners | |
| Mississippi | Board of Supervisors | |
| Missouri | County Commission | |
| Montana | County Commission | |
| Nebraska | Board of Commissioners Board of Supervisors | |
| Nevada | Board of County Commissioners | |
| New Hampshire | Board of County Commissioners | |
| New Jersey | Board of County Commissioners | formerly known as the Board of Chosen Freeholders |
| New Mexico | Board of County Commissioners | |
| New York | County legislature Board of representatives Board of supervisors | |
| North Carolina | Board of County Commissioners | |
| North Dakota | Board of County Commissioners | |
| Ohio | Board of County Commissioners | |
| Oklahoma | Board of County Commissioners | |
| Oregon | Board of County Commissioners County Court | |
| Pennsylvania | Board of Commissioners | |
| Rhode Island | | |
| South Carolina | County Council | |
| South Dakota | Board of Commissioners | |
| Tennessee | Board of Commissioners | |
| Texas | Commissioners' Court | |
| Utah | County Commission | |
| Vermont | Assistant Judges | |
| Virginia | Board of Supervisors | |
| Washington | County Council Board of Supervisors | |
| West Virginia | County Commission | |
| Wisconsin | Board of Supervisors | |
| Wyoming | Board of County Commissioners | |

=== Arkansas ===
In Arkansas the quorum court of a county is the legislative body of that county. The chief executive officer of each county is the county judge, who sits on the quorum court primarily as a moderator but enjoys the power of veto. The county judge is in charge of the county road system, and can fill in for circuit court judges in their absence. Each quorum court is elected from single-member districts, with the number of commissioners (called justices of the peace) depending on the population of the county.

=== Missouri ===
In 1939, Missouri enacted legislation changing from a county court system to a county commission in which the county commission is composed of three elected commissioners. In addition to legislative powers, judicial powers include the ability to compel testimony under oath, the ability to issue citations for contempt, and the ability to make findings of fact.

U. S. President Harry S. Truman began his political career in 1926 as a county judge in Jackson County, Missouri.

=== Nebraska ===
In Nebraska, some counties are governed by a board of supervisors while others are governed by a county commission.

=== Pennsylvania ===
In Pennsylvania, "Board of Supervisors" is the name of the body governing townships of the second class that have not adopted a home rule charter. By default, a Pennsylvania township board of supervisors consists of three members, elected at large in odd-numbered years to staggered six-year terms. Voters of a township of the second class can vote to expand the board to five members. By contrast, townships of the first class elect a Board of Commissioners, either consisting of 5 at large members in townships without wards, or choosing one member from each ward (15 being the maximum number of wards permitted).

=== Texas ===
The governing body of each of Texas 254 counties is the commissioners court. In Texas, the court has five members: the county judge and four commissioners. A sixth official, the county clerk, is an ex officio member of the court.

== See also ==
- Board of Selectmen (New England)
- County council
- County executive
