= Green wave =

Traffic signal timing technique

A green wave or platoon effect occurs when a series of traffic lights (usually three or more) are coordinated to allow continuous traffic flow over several intersections in one main direction.

Any vehicle traveling along with the green wave (at an approximate speed decided upon by the traffic engineers) will see a progressive cascade of green lights, and not have to stop at intersections. This allows higher traffic loads, and reduces noise and energy use (because less acceleration and braking is needed). In practical use, only a group of cars (known as a "platoon", the size of which is defined by the signal times) can use the green wave before the time band is interrupted to give way to other traffic flows.

== Design ==
Traffic engineers, when assessing traffic flow within signalized and unsignalized intersections, factor in the effect of green waves. For example, when there are traffic signals within 0.25 mi (400 m) of an intersection, the traffic arrival cannot been seen as random. The common practice is to coordinate major street traffic signals less than 1 mi (1.6 km) apart. The actual green wave effect may last up to 2.0 mi (3.2 km).

=== Timing for one-way streets ===
When timing the green wave, the entire system must share a common cycle length, though in some rare circumstances, high traffic volume may require a double cycle length at certain intersections. An ideal signal offset, defined as time required for the subject traffic signal turning green as soon as first vehicle of a platoon arrives at the downstream signal, is then calculated for each intersection:
$$t_{ideal} = \frac{L}{S}$$
where:

- $t_{ideal}$ = ideal offset
- $L$ = distance between two signalized intersections
- $S$ = average platoon speed

However, the ideal situation assumes no downstream queues, which may occur when not all vehicles from the previous platoon clear through the red signal ("stragglers"), and when vehicles from outside the subject road enter the traffic. As a result, an adjustment to the offset is made:

$$t_{adjust} = t_{ideal} - (Qh + l_{1}) = \frac{L}{S} - (Qh + l_{1})$$

where:

- $t_{adjust}$ = adjusted ideal offset, in seconds
- $Q$ = number of vehicles queued per lane
- $h$ = discharge headway of queued vehicles, in seconds per vehicle
- $l_{1}$ = start-up lost time, in seconds

As a result of this adjustment, the signal's "green wave" is progressing faster than the vehicles' arriving platoon to pick up queued vehicles.

Bandwidth, defined as time difference between the first vehicle can pass through the entire system nonstop and the last vehicle can do the same, is essentially a "green window" that follows the platoon. Bandwidth efficiency, defined as the ratio of bandwidth to the system's cycle length, is calculated as such:

$$EFF_{BW} = \frac{BW}{C}$$
where:

- $EFF_{BW}$ = bandwidth efficiency, in percentage (%)
- $BW$ = bandwidth, in seconds
- $C$ = cycle length, in seconds

A good bandwidth efficiency is between 40 - 55%. Bandwidth capacity, defined as vehicles that can pass through signals without stopping, is calculated as such:

$$c_{BW} = \frac{3600 (sec/hr) \times BW \times L}{C \times h}$$
where:

- $c_{BW}$ = bandwidth capacity, in vehicle per hour
- $BW$ = bandwidth, in seconds
- $L$ = number of through lanes in the subject direction
- $C$ = cycle length, in seconds
- $h$ = saturation headway, time difference between two adjacent vehicles in a queue passing through green lights, in seconds per vehicle

=== Timing for two-way streets and networks ===
When it comes to coordinated signals for multiple streets running in multiple directions, including two-way streets and streets in a grid, the general approach is to vary the duration of the effective green time, such that by the time a platoon finishes a circle and return to its initial position, the light turns green just in time. For a two-way street, this means:

$$n \times C = t_{12} + t_{21}$$
where:

- $n$ = an integer ≥ 1
- $C$ = cycle length, in seconds
- $t_{12}$ = offset for the traffic direction traveling from intersection 1 to intersection 2, in seconds
- $t_{21}$ = offset for the traffic direction traveling from intersection 2 to intersection 1, in seconds

Timing signal offset for a coordinated traffic signal system in a simple one-way street grid

For a grid of a one-way streets, such as a simple square-shaped grid going from intersection 1, to intersection 2, to intersection 3, to intersection 4, and back to intersection 1, the formula may be expressed as such:
$$n \times C = t_{12} + g_{2}+t_{23} + g_{3}+t_{34} + g_{4}+t_{41} + g_{1}$$
where:

- $n$ = an integer ≥ 1
- $C$ = cycle length, in seconds
- $t_{ij}$ = offset for the traffic direction traveling from intersection $i$ to intersection $j$, in seconds
- $g_{i}$ = green time at intersection $i$, in seconds

=== Types of progression ===
A progression refers to how the "green window" moves along the signal system. A simple progression is where all traffic signals are timed using ideal signal offset — platoon arrives exactly when lights are turning green. Forward progression describes a green wave advancing with the vehicles. Reverse progression, on the other hand, happens when the downstream signal must turn green before the upstream signal does so to clear a large queue building up at the downstream intersection. This means the signal offset is negative, and the green wave moves in the opposite direction of the vehicle flow. Flexible progression refers to traffic signal modified multiple times throughout a day to conform to the changing major flow. An alternating progression is where traffic signals alternate down the street between red, green, red, green, and so forth. This progression is suitable when street length is uniform, and effective green time is split half and half. Similarly, a double-alternating progression is when traffic can travel two blocks in one traffic cycle length. A simultaneous progressions means all the traffic signals turn green / red at the same time and may be used for closely spaced signals and/or high vehicular speeds. This progression can be advantageous to prevent traffic from severely queuing up when the traffic flow is heavy.

=== Adaptive controls ===
The coordination of the signals is sometimes done dynamically, according to sensor data of currently existing traffic flows - otherwise it is done statically, by the use of timers. Under certain circumstances, green waves can be interwoven with each other, but this increases their complexity and reduces usability, so in conventional set-ups only the roads and directions with the heaviest loads get this preferential treatment.

=== Cyclists ===
Green waves are sometimes used to facilitate bicycle traffic. Copenhagen, Amsterdam, San Francisco, and other cities may synchronize traffic signals to provide a green light for a flow of cyclists. On San Francisco's Valencia Street, the signals were retimed in early 2009 to provide a green wave in both directions, possibly the first street in the world with a two-way green wave for cyclists. In Copenhagen, a green wave on the arterial street Nørrebrogade facilitates 30,000 cyclists to maintain a speed of 20 km/h (12 mph) for 2.5 km (1.6 mi). In Amsterdam, cyclists riding at a speed of 15 to 18 km/h (9.3 to 11.2 mph) will be able to travel without being stopped by a red signal.

=== Railroad ===
In a more limited sense, the term Green wave has also been applied to railroad travel. For several years starting in the 1960s, the German Federal Railway maintained an advertising campaign featuring the slogan German: garantiert grüne Welle, lit. 'guaranteed green wave', which communicated the notion of speed, limited delays and open track blocks to potential customers choosing between train and automobile travel, and was featured prominently in promotional materials ranging from posters to radio jingles.

== Diagram ==
Traffic engineers use time-space diagrams to plot time against intersection position, scaled with respect to the distance. The diagram shows multiple intersections and their phase for a given time and direction and is thus frequently used for coordinated traffic signal system studies.

== Benefit ==
In 2011, a study modeled the implementation of green waves during the night in a busy Manchester suburb (Chorlton-cum-Hardy) using S-Paramics microsimulation and the AIRE emissions module. The results showed using green wave signal setups on a network have the potential to:

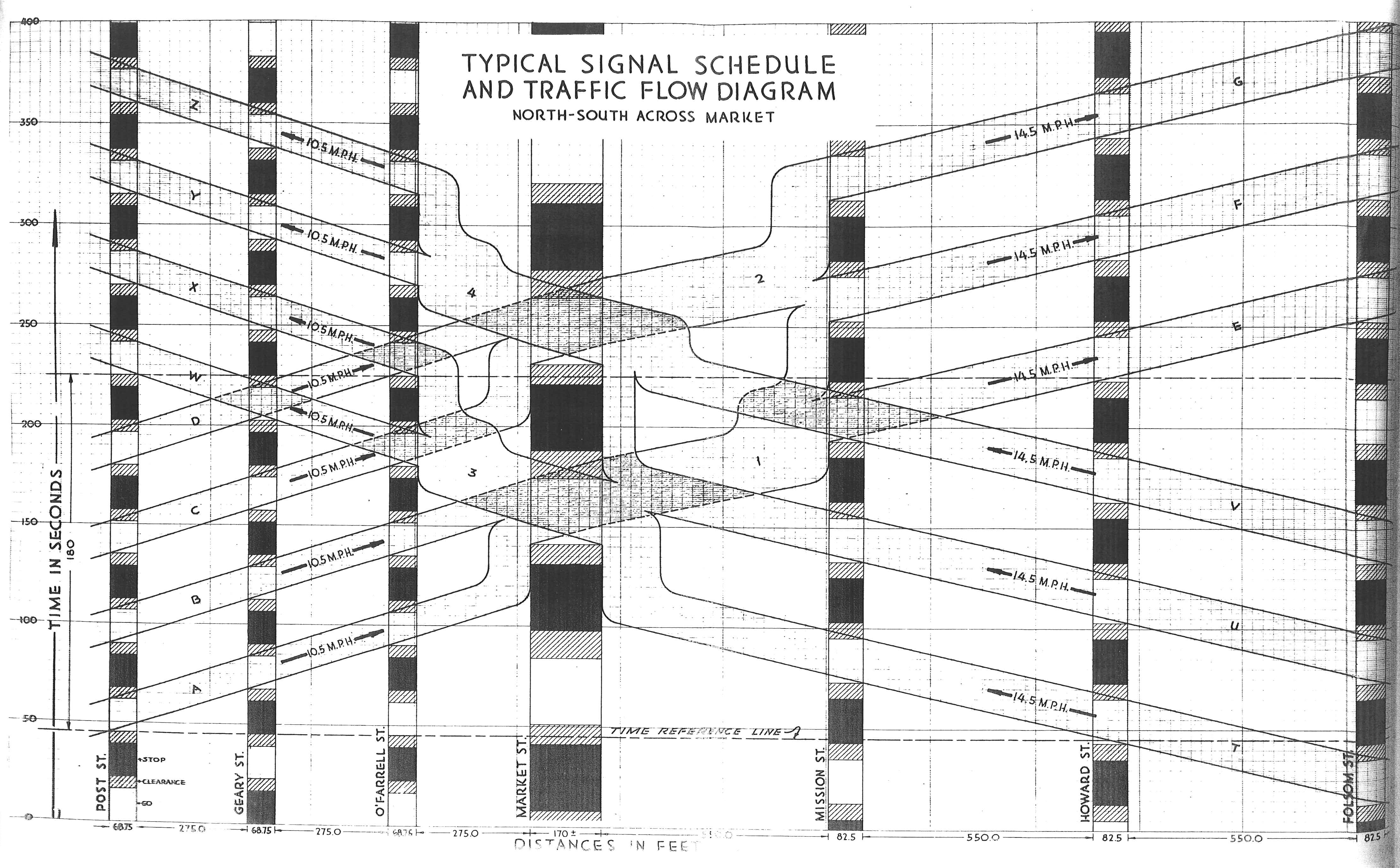
Typical Signal Schedule and Traffic Flow Diagram, north–south across Market (1929) From Signal Timing Schedule for Traffic Control Plan, June 15, 1929. Attempted "green wave": 8.5mph on Market; 50 vara district: 10.5 mph north–south, 14.5 mph east–west; 100 vara district: 14.5mph north-south, 20.5mph east-west.

- Reduce CO_{2}, NO_{x}, and PM_{10} emissions from traffic.
- Reduce fuel consumption of vehicles.
- Be used on roads that intersect with other green waves.
- Reduce the time cars wait at side roads.
- Give pedestrians more time to cross at crossings and help them to cross streets as vehicles travel in platoons
- Control the speed of traffic in urban areas.
- Reduce component wear of vehicles and indirect energy consumption through their manufacture

A green wave in both directions may be possible with different speed recommendations for each direction, otherwise traffic coming from one direction may reach the traffic light faster than from the other direction if the distance from the previous traffic light is not mathematically a multiple of the opposite direction. Alternatively a dual carriageway may be suitable for green waves in both directions if there is sufficient space in the central reservation to allow pedestrians to wait and separate pedestrian crossing stages for each side of the road.

Tests show that public transport can benefit as well and cars may travel slightly slower.

== Usage ==
In Vienna, Austria a stretch of cycle path on Lassallestraße in the 2nd district has a display that tells cyclists their speed and the speed they must maintain to make the next green light.

Frederiksberg, a part of Copenhagen, the capital of Denmark, has implemented a green wave for emergency vehicles to improve the public services.

In the UK, in 2009, it was revealed that the Department for Transport had previously discouraged green waves as they reduced fuel usage, and thus less revenue was raised from fuel taxes. Despite this government Webtag documents were only updated in 2011. It is still unclear if the economic appraisal software used to apply these guidelines has also been updated and if the new guidelines are being applied to new projects.

== See also ==
- Bus priority signal
- Fundamental diagram of traffic flow
- Road traffic control
- Traffic wave
- Michigan Left
