= Floating car data =

Speed data collected by vehicles

Floating car data (FCD) in traffic engineering and management is typically timestamped geo-localization and speed data directly collected by moving vehicles, in contrast to traditional traffic data collected at a fixed location by a stationary device or observer. In a physical interpretation context, FCD provides a Lagrangian description of the vehicle movements whereas stationary devices provide an Eulerian description. The participating vehicle acts itself consequently as a moving sensor using an onboard GPS receiver or cellular phone. The most common and widespread use of FCD is to determine the traffic speed on the road network. Based on these data, traffic congestion can be identified, travel times can be calculated, and traffic reports can be rapidly generated. In contrast to stationary devices such as traffic cameras, number plate recognition systems, and induction loops embedded in the roadway, no additional hardware on the road network is necessary.

== Floating cellular data ==
Floating cellular data is one of the methods to collect floating car data. This method uses cellular network data (CDMA, GSM, UMTS, GPRS). No special devices/hardware are necessary: every switched-on mobile phone becomes a traffic probe and is as such an anonymous source of information. The location of the mobile phone is determined using (1) triangulation or (2) the hand-over data stored by the network operator. As GSM localisation is less accurate than GPS based systems, many phones must be tracked and complex algorithms used to extract high-quality data. For example, care must be taken not to misinterpret cellular phones on a high speed railway track near the road as incredibly fast journeys along the road. However, the more congestion, the more cars, the more phones and thus more probes. In metropolitan areas where traffic data are most needed the distance between cell sites is lower and thus precision increases. Advantages over GPS-based or conventional methods such as cameras or street embedded sensors include: No infrastructure or hardware in cars or along the road. It is much less expensive, offers more coverage of more streets, it is faster to set up (no work zones) and needs less maintenance. In 2007, GDOT demonstrated in Atlanta that such system can emulate very well road sensors data for section speeds. A 2007 study by GMU investigated the relationship between vehicle free flow speed and geometric variables on urban street segments using FCD.

== Vehicle re-identification ==
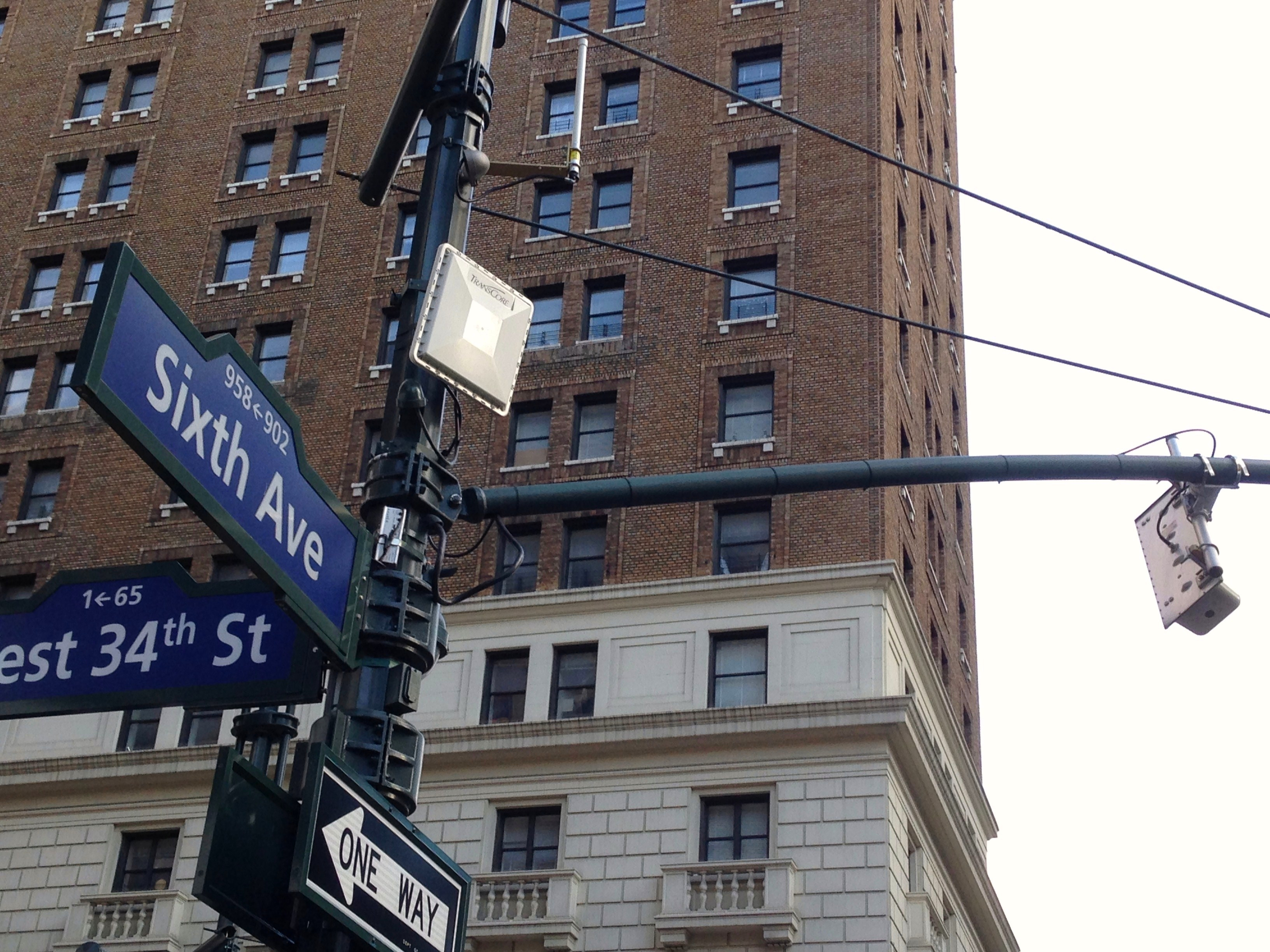
RFID E-ZPass reader attached to the pole and its antenna (right) used in traffic monitoring in New York City by using vehicle re-identification method

Vehicle re-identification methods require sets of detectors mounted along the road. In this technique, a unique serial number for a device in the vehicle is detected at one location and then detected again (re-identified) further down the road. Travel times and speed are calculated by comparing the time at which a specific device is detected by pairs of sensors. This can be done using the MAC addresses from Bluetooth devices, or using the radio-frequency identification (RFID) serial numbers from Electronic Toll Collection (ETC) transponders (also called "toll tags").

The ETC transponders, which are uniquely identifiable, may be read not only at toll collection points (e.g. toll bridges) but also at many non-toll locations. This is used as a method to collect traffic flow data (which is anonymized) for the San Francisco Bay Area's 5-1-1 service.

In New York City's Midtown in Motion program, its adaptive traffic control system also use RFID readers to track movement of E-ZPass tags as a means of monitoring traffic flow. The data is fed through the government-dedicated broadband wireless infrastructure to the traffic management center to be used in adaptive traffic control of the traffic lights.

== Global Positioning System ==
A small number of cars (typically fleet vehicles such as courier services and taxi drivers) are equipped with a box that contains a GPS receiver. The data are then communicated with the service provider using the regular on-board radio unit or via cellular network data (more expensive).

It is possible that FCD could be used as a surveillance method, although the companies deploying FCD systems give assurances that all data are anonymized in their systems, or kept sufficiently secure to prevent abuses.

== See also ==
- Traffic count
