= Traffic bottleneck =

Localized disruption of vehicular traffic on a street, road, or highway

Bottleneck caused by construction

A traffic bottleneck is a localized disruption of vehicular traffic on a street, road, or highway. As opposed to a traffic jam, a bottleneck is a result of a specific physical condition, often the design of the road, badly timed traffic lights, or sharp curves. They can also be caused by temporary situations, such as vehicular accidents.

Bottlenecks can also occur in other methods of transportation. Capacity bottlenecks are the most vulnerable points in a network and are very often the subject of offensive or defensive military actions. Capacity bottlenecks of strategic importance - such as the Panama Canal where traffic is limited by the infrastructure - are normally referred to as choke points; capacity bottlenecks of tactical value are referred to as mobility corridors.

== Causes ==
Traffic bottlenecks are caused by a wide variety of things:

- Construction zones where one or more existing lanes become unavailable (as depicted in the diagram on the right)
- Accident sites that temporarily close lanes
- Narrowing a low-capacity highway road
- Terrain (e.g., uphill sections, very sharp curves)
- Poorly timed traffic lights
- Slow vehicles that disrupt upstream traffic flow upstream (also known as a "moving bottleneck")
- Rubbernecking

Rubbernecking is an example of how bottlenecks can be induced by psychological factors; for example, vehicles safely pulled to the shoulder by a police car often result in passing drivers to slow down to "get a better look" at the situation.

== Graphical and theoretical representation ==
Traffic flow theory can be used to model and represent bottlenecks.

=== Stationary bottleneck ===

Consider a stretch of highway with two lanes in one direction. Suppose that the fundamental diagram is modeled as shown here. The highway has a peak capacity of Q vehicles per hour, corresponding to a density of k_{c} vehicles per mile. The highway normally becomes jammed at k_{j} vehicles per mile.

Before capacity is reached, traffic may flow at A vehicles per hour, or a higher B vehicles per hour. In either case, the speed of vehicles is v_{f} (or "free flow"), because the roadway is under capacity.

Now, suppose that at a certain location x_{0}, the highway narrows to one lane. The maximum capacity is now limited to D’, or half of Q, since only one lane of the two is available. State D shares the same flow rate as state D', but its vehicular density is higher.

Using a time-space diagram, we may model the bottleneck event. Suppose that at time t_{0}, traffic begins to flow at rate B and speed v_{f}. After time t_{1}, vehicles arrive at the lighter flowrate A.

Before the first vehicles reach location x_{0}, the traffic flow is unimpeded. However, downstream of x_{0}, the roadway narrows, reducing the capacity by half—and to below that of state B. Due to this, vehicles will begin queuing upstream of x_{0}. This is represented by high-density state D. The vehicle speed in this state is the slower v_{d}, as taken from the fundamental diagram. Downstream of the bottleneck, vehicles transition to state D', where they again travel at free-flow speed v_{f}.

Once vehicles arrive at rate A starting at time t_{1}, the queue will begin to clear and eventually dissipate. State A has a flowrate below the one-lane capacity of states D and D'.

On the time-space diagram, a sample vehicle trajectory is represented with a dotted arrow line. The diagram can readily represent vehicular delay and queue length. It is a simple matter of taking horizontal and vertical measurements within the region of state D.

=== Dynamic bottleneck ===
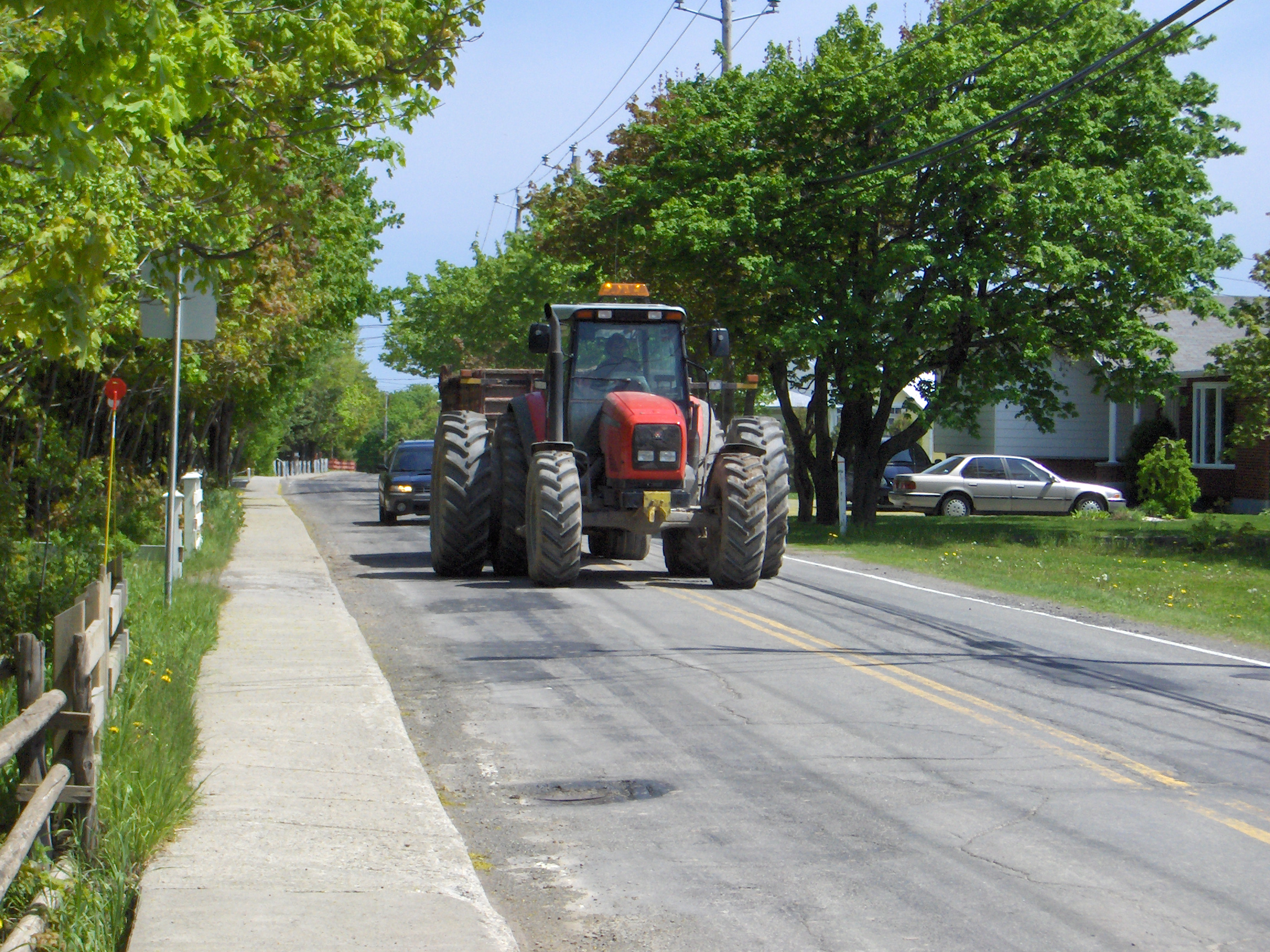
A slow tractor creates a moving bottleneck.

For this example, consider three lanes of traffic in one direction. Assume that a truck starts traveling at speed v, more slowly than at the free-flow speed v_{f}. As shown on the fundamental diagram below, speed q_{u} represents the reduced capacity (two-thirds of Q, i.e., 2 out of 3 lanes available) around the truck.

State A represents normal approaching traffic flow, again at speed v_{f}. State U, with flowrate q_{u}, corresponds to the queuing upstream of the truck. On the fundamental diagram, vehicle speed v_{u} is slower than speed v_{f}. But once drivers have navigated around the truck, they can again speed up and transition to downstream state D. While this state travels at free flow, the vehicle density is less because fewer vehicles get around the bottleneck.

Suppose that, at time t, the truck slows from the free-flow rate to v. A queue builds behind the truck, represented by state U. Within the region of state U, vehicles move more slowly, as indicated by the sample trajectory. Because state U limits to a smaller flow than state A, the queue will back up behind the truck and eventually crowd out the entire highway (slope s is negative). If state U had the higher flow, there would still be a growing queue. However, it would not back up because the slope s would be positive.

== See also ==
- Choke point
- Traffic flow
- Traffic congestion
