= Traffic wave =

Type of highway congestion

Animation depicting how a "shock wave" caused by a single vehicle stoppage (red car) gets passed downstream, causing a traffic slowdown downstream.

"Accordion" caused by local traffic congestion

Traffic waves, which are also called stop waves, ghost jams, traffic snakes or traffic shocks, are traveling disturbances in the distribution of cars on a highway. Traffic waves travel backwards relative to the cars themselves. Relative to a fixed spot on the road the wave can move with, or against the traffic, or even be stationary (when the wave moves away from the traffic with exactly the same speed as the traffic). Traffic waves are a type of traffic jam. A deeper understanding of traffic waves is a goal of the physical study of traffic flow, in which traffic itself can often be seen using techniques similar to those used in fluid dynamics. It is related to the accordion effect.

== Variations ==
=== Phantom traffic jams ===
A phantom traffic jam occurs while traffic is in free-flow, when a small perturbance with no obvious causation results in a chain of equidistant moving vehicles to build up a high local density. This is because the traffic flow is inherently unstable at higher density.

== Mitigation ==
It has been said that by knowing how traffic waves are created, drivers can sometimes reduce their effects by increasing vehicle headways and reducing the use of brakes, ultimately alleviating traffic congestion for everyone in the area. However, in other models, increasing headway leads to diminishing the capacity of the travel lanes, increasing the congestion; however, disputed by acknowledging that similar principles apply to herding sheep through gates, and that in such a case, via human intervention, solitons are diminished simply by slapping "stuck sheep" and holding back aggressive sheep. In funnelling sheep through gates it can be determined how much intervention is needed to curb bottlenecks. Similar principles can be applied to human traffic streams, where, if each individual had the knowledge of final destination and complete route planning, then traversal along a route would be done so with the full knowledge that any abrupt change from any itinerary causes delays for those about to traverse the same route.

== History ==
The earliest theoretical model of traffic shock waves was offered by Lighthill and Whitham in 1955. The following year Paul Richards independently published a similar model. Both papers were based on fluid dynamics and the model is known as the Lighthill–Whitham–Richards model.

== See also ==
- Autonomous cruise control system
- Fundamental diagram of traffic flow
- Green wave
- Road traffic control
- Rule 184
- Wavelength
- Shock wave
- Standing wave
