= MTSA =

The initials MTSA could stand for:

- Metropolitan Travel Survey Archive
- Mobile Telecommunications Sourcing Act
- Maritime Transportation Security Act of 2002
- Methylated-thiol-coenzyme M methyltransferase, an enzyme
