= Datamaster =

Datamaster or DataMaster may refer to:

- Autometric DataMaster, a software by Autometric
- Datamaster (database management system), former name of DataEase software
- Data steward, a data governance profession
- IBM Datamaster, IBM System/23 system
