= International tourism =

Travel for pleasure or business that crosses national borders

International tourist trips

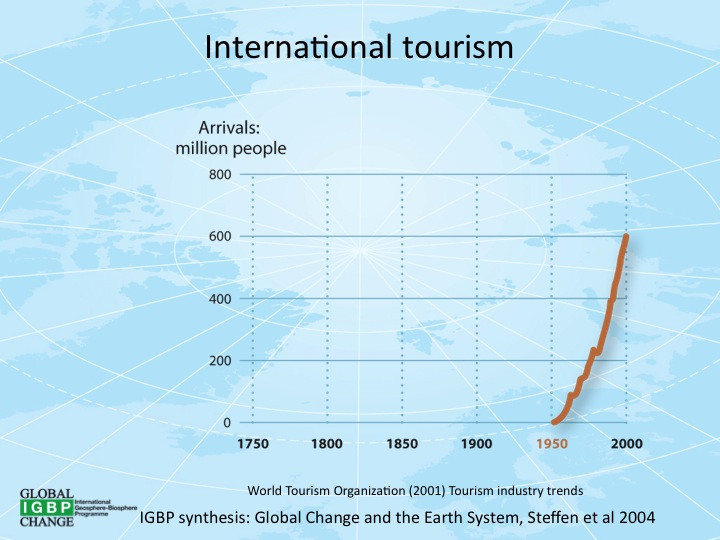
International tourism over time.

International tourist arrivals per year by region.

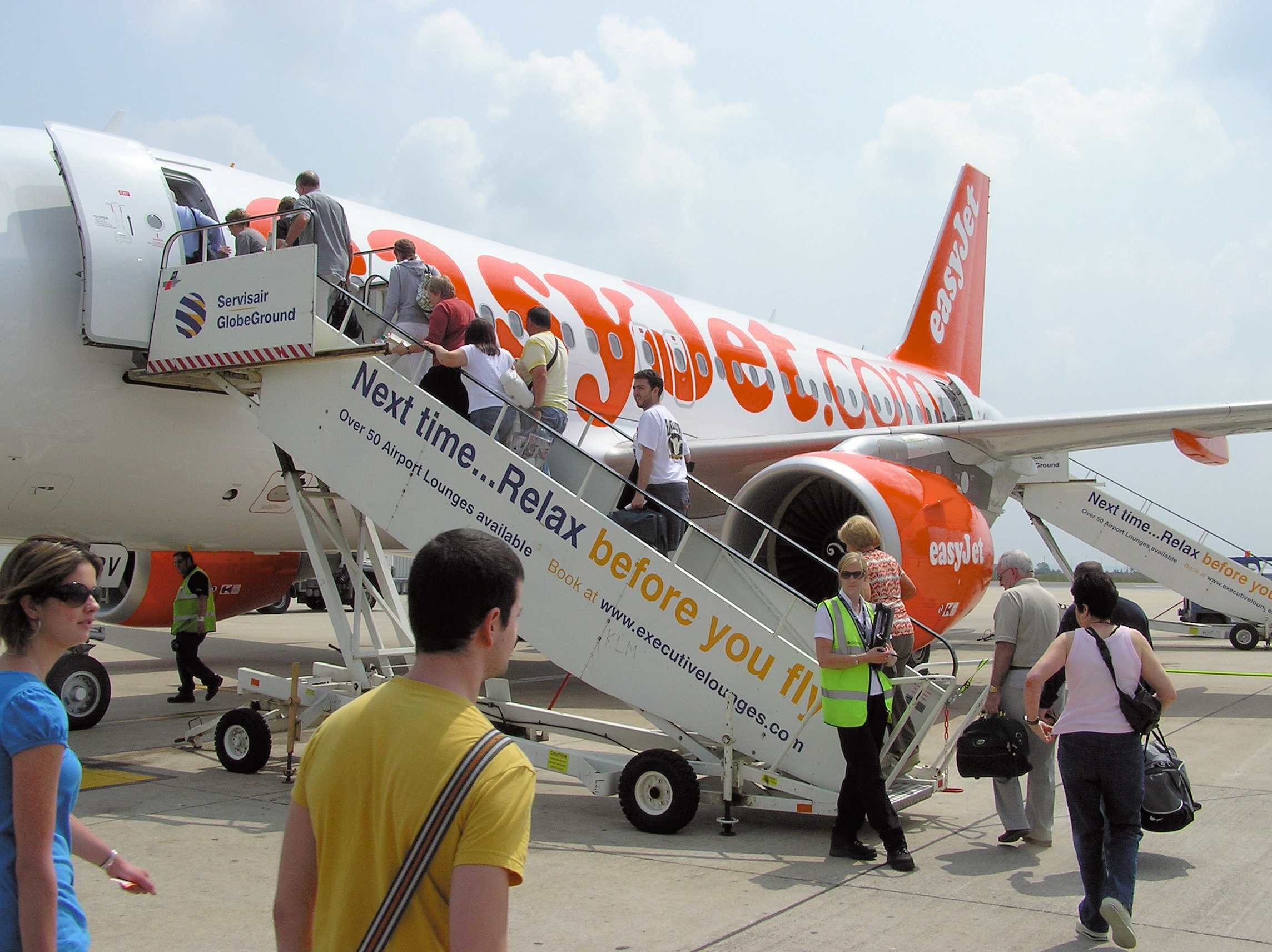
Modern aviation has made it possible to travel long distances quickly.

International tourism is tourism that crosses national borders. Globalization has made tourism a popular global leisure activity. The World Tourism Organization defines tourists as people "traveling to and staying in places outside their usual environment for not more than one consecutive year for leisure, business and other purposes". The World Health Organization (WHO) estimates that up to 500,000 people are in flight at any one time.

In 2010, international tourism reached US$919B, growing 6.5% over 2009, corresponding to an increase in real terms of 4.7%. In 2010, there were over 940 million international tourist arrivals worldwide. By 2016 that number had risen to 1,235 million, producing 1,220 billion USD in destination spending. The COVID-19 crisis had significant negative effects on international tourism significantly slowing the overall increasing trend.

International tourism has significant impacts on the environment, exacerbated in part by the problems created by air travel but also by other issues, including wealthy tourists bringing lifestyles that stress local infrastructure, water and trash systems among others.

== History ==
As a result of the late-2000s recession, international travel demand suffered a strong slowdown from the second half of 2008 through the end of 2009. This negative trend intensified during 2009, exacerbated in some countries due to the outbreak of the H1N1 influenza virus, resulting in a worldwide decline of 4.2% in 2009 to 880 million international tourists arrivals, and a 5.7% decline in international tourism receipts.

=== COVID-19 ===
The COVID-19 pandemic has impacted the tourism industry due to the resulting travel restrictions as well as slump in demand among travelers. The tourism industry has been massively affected by the spread of coronavirus, as many countries have introduced travel restrictions in an attempt to contain its spread. The United Nations World Tourism Organization estimated that global international tourist arrivals could have decreased by 58% to 78% in 2020, leading to a potential loss of US$0.9–1.2 trillion in international tourism receipts.

In many of the world's cities, planned travel went down by 80–90%. Conflicting and unilateral travel restrictions occurred regionally and many tourist attractions around the world, such as museums, amusement parks, gyms and sports venues closed down. After March 2020, tourist firms' connectivity has skyrocketed. Restaurants are the most significantly impacted subsectors of tourism, followed by airline firms. UNWTO reported a 65% drop in international tourist arrivals in the first six months of 2020. Air passenger travel showed a similar decline. The United Nations Conference on Trade and Development released a report in June 2021 stating that the global economy could lose over US$4 trillion as a result of the pandemic.

International tourism recovered gradually from 2021 as travel restrictions eased. According to UN Tourism (formerly the UNWTO), around 1.3 billion international arrivals were recorded in 2023, about 88% of pre-pandemic levels. In 2024 an estimated 1.4 billion tourists travelled internationally — roughly 99% of the 2019 level and 11% higher than 2023 — marking a virtual return to pre-pandemic volumes, while international tourism receipts reached about US$1.6 trillion

Some people have taken advantage of airlines drastically reducing their fares to travel for leisure despite multiple warnings to remain at home, along with two-week self-quarantine requirements upon arrival or return from travel.

Together with a decreased willingness to travel, the restrictions have had a negative economic impact on the travel sector in those regions. A possible long-term impact has been a decline of business travel and international conferencing, and the rise of their virtual, online equivalents. Concerns have been raised over the effectiveness of travel restrictions to contain the spread of COVID-19.

In Cambodia, Foreign arrivals in March 2020 fell by 65% year-on-year. Angkor Wat, usually crowded with thousands of tourists per day, was left almost deserted, with an average of 22 ticket sales per day for the whole Angkor National Park during April 2020. In Vietnam, Foreign arrivals in April 2020 fell by 98% year-on-year.

== Rankings ==
=== Total volume of cross-border tourist travel ===
International tourist arrivals reached 1.035 billion in 2012, up from over 996 million in 2011, and 952 million in 2010. In 2011 and 2012, international travel demand continued to recover from the losses resulting from the late-2000s recession, where tourism suffered a strong slowdown from the second half of 2008 through the end of 2009. After a 5% increase in the first half of 2008, growth in international tourist arrivals moved into negative territory in the second half of 2008, and ended up only 2% for the year, compared to a 7% increase in 2007. The negative trend intensified during 2009, exacerbated in some countries due to the outbreak of the H1N1 influenza virus, resulting in a worldwide decline of 4.2% in 2009 to 880 million international tourists arrivals, and a 5.7% decline in international tourism receipts.

== Most visited destinations by international arrivals ==
The following table compares major international tourism destinations using official statistics available for 2025. For European countries, the figures are based on arrivals of non-residents at tourist accommodation establishments, as recorded by Eurostat. For other countries, the figures are derived from official national statistics on international visitor arrivals.

As statistical definitions and collection methods differ between countries, the ranking is indicative and does not constitute a fully harmonised international comparison.

International tourist arrivals in 2025
Rank	Destination	International arrivals	Source
1	Italy	87,897,260	Eurostat
2	Spain	79,995,357	Eurostat
3	United States	68,287,793	NTTO
4	France	58,740,022	Eurostat
5	Turkey	48,817,851	Eurostat
6	Mexico	47,786,710	Banco de México / INEGI
7	Japan	42,683,600	JNTO
8	United Kingdom	40,800,000	ONS
9	Germany	37,134,349	Eurostat
10	China	Approx. 35,170,000	NBS

=== Methodological notes ===
- Under international statistical definitions, an international tourist is a non-resident visitor who spends at least one night in the country visited. Same-day visitors and passengers in transit who do not enter the country are excluded from this definition.
- Eurostat figures measure arrivals at registered tourist accommodation establishments. A visitor staying at more than one establishment during a single trip may be counted more than once.
- Figures for the United States, Mexico and the United Kingdom are derived from national statistics on international visits rather than exclusively from arrivals at tourist accommodation establishments.
- For Japan, the figures published by the Japan National Tourism Organization (JNTO) include certain categories of temporary entrants and are not restricted exclusively to overnight tourists.
- For China, the 2025 figure refers to approximately 35.17 million inbound visits by foreign nationals, excluding the 119.32 million visits from Hong Kong, Macao and Taiwan. The source does not provide a breakdown allowing all same-day visitors and transit passengers to be excluded.
- Due to differences in statistical definitions, coverage and collection methods, the figures are not fully comparable and should not be interpreted as an official ranking published by UN Tourism.

== International tourist overnight stays ==
The following table compares selected major international tourism destinations by the number of nights spent by non-resident visitors in 2025. The figures are based on official statistics published by Eurostat and national statistical and tourism authorities.

For countries covered by Eurostat, the figures include nights spent at hotels and similar accommodation establishments, holiday and other short-stay accommodation, and camping grounds. National statistics for other countries may cover a broader range of accommodation types, including private accommodation and stays with friends or relatives.

The figures are therefore not fully comparable and do not constitute an official worldwide ranking published by UN Tourism.

=== Nights spent in accommodation facilities (hotels, campsites, etc.) ===
International tourist overnight stays in 2025
Rank	Country	UN Tourism Geographical region	Overnight stays (2025)
1	United States	North America	367 million
2	Spain	Europe	328.9 million
3	Italy	Europe	301.6 million
4	China	Asia	180 million
5	Turkey	Asia	154.8 million
6	France	Europe	150.8 million
7	United Kingdom	Europe	149.8 million
8	Mexico	North America	135 million
9	Greece	Europe	131 million
10	Japan	Asia	110 million

=== Methodological notes ===
- Overnight stays measure the total number of nights spent by visitors rather than the number of individual tourists or international arrivals.
- Eurostat figures cover non-residents staying at tourist accommodation establishments classified under NACE divisions 55.1, 55.2 and 55.3, including hotels, holiday accommodation and campsites.
- From 2025 onwards, Italian accommodation statistics also include private rental accommodation managed on a non-entrepreneurial basis, resulting in a break in the statistical series.
- United Kingdom figures include nights spent by overseas residents in different types of accommodation and are classified as official statistics in development.
- Japanese figures are based on the Accommodation Travel Statistics Survey and refer to foreign guest nights at accommodation establishments.
- Comparable nationwide totals for the United States, China and Mexico are not included in the table.
- Differences in statistical coverage, reporting thresholds and accommodation categories limit the comparability of these figures.

=== Historical developments ===
Following the decline in international tourism in 2009, international tourist arrivals recovered in 2010 and continued to increase in subsequent years. Global international tourist arrivals exceeded one billion for the first time in 2012, reaching approximately 1.035 billion.

In 2013, international tourist arrivals increased by 5%, reaching approximately 1.087 billion.

According to UN Tourism, international tourist arrivals reached approximately 1.52 billion in 2025, representing an increase of 4% compared with 2024.

In 2025, the European Union recorded approximately 3.14 billion overnight stays at tourist accommodation establishments, an increase of 4.1% compared with 2024. International guests accounted for 48.9% of these overnight stays, while domestic guests accounted for 51.1%.

=== International tourism receipts ===
The World Tourism Organization reports that international tourism receipts were US$1.7 trillion in 2018, an increase in real terms of 4% over 2017. The top ten tourism earners in 2018 were:

Rank	Country/Area	International tourism receipts (2018)
1	United States	$214.00 billion
2	Spain	$74.00 billion
3	France	$67.00 billion
4	Thailand	$63.00 billion
5	United Kingdom	$52.00 billion
6	Italy	$49.00 billion
7	Egypt	$45.00 billion
8	Germany	$43.00 billion
9	Japan	$41.00 billion
10	China	$40.00 billion

=== International tourism expenditure ===
The World Tourism Organization reports the following countries as the ten biggest spenders on international tourism for the year 2018.

Rank	Country	International tourism expenditure (2018)
1	China	$277 billion
2	United States	$144 billion
3	Germany	$94 billion
4	United Kingdom	$76 billion
5	France	$48 billion
6	Australia	$37 billion
7	Russia	$35 billion
8	Canada	$33 billion
9	South Korea	$32 billion
10	Italy	$30 billion

=== Euromonitor International Top City Destinations Ranking ===
Euromonitor International rated these the world's most visited cities by international tourists in 2017:

Rank	City	Country	International tourist arrivals
1	Hong Kong	China	27.88 million
2	Bangkok	Thailand	22.45 million
3	London	United Kingdom	19.82 million
4	Singapore	Singapore	17.61 million
5	Cairo	Egypt	17.33 million
6	Paris	France	15.83 million
7	Dubai	United Arab Emirates	15.79 million
8	New York City	United States	13.10 million
9	Macau	China	12.84 million
10	Kuala Lumpur	Malaysia	12.47 million

=== World Travel and Tourism Council ===
Countries showing strong international travel and tourism growth between 2010 and 2016
Rank	Country	Percentage
1	Myanmar	73.5%
2	Sudan	49.8%
3	Azerbaijan	36.4%
4	Qatar	34.1%
5	São Tomé and Príncipe	30.1%
6	Sri Lanka	26.4%
7	Cameroon	25.5%
8	(Georgia (country)) Georgia	22.7%
9	Iceland	20.0%
10	Kyrgyzstan	19.5%

Countries that performed best in fastest growing tourism and travel industry in 2016
Rank	Country	Percentage
1	Azerbaijan	46.1%
2	Mongolia	24.4%
3	Iceland	20.1%
4	Cyprus	15.4%
5	Kazakhstan	15.2%
6	Moldova	14.2%
7	Costa Rica	12.1%
8	(Georgia (country)) Georgia	11.2%
9	Sri Lanka	10.7%
10	Thailand	10.7%
