= Spatial interaction model =

Spatial interaction model may refer to:

- Gravity model
- Spatial analysis
