= PCSA =

PCSA may stand for:

- Primary census statistical area, in the United States census
- Physiological cross sectional area of a pennate muscle
- Primary care service area, geographic areas that are self-sufficient markets of primary care medicine
- Presbyterian Church of Southern Africa
- Priory Community School
- Protect College Sports Act, a proposed piece of US federal legislation
