= Route assignment =

Transportation networks

Route assignment, route choice, or traffic assignment concerns the selection of routes (alternatively called paths) between origins and destinations in transportation networks. It is the fourth step in the conventional transportation forecasting model, following trip generation, trip distribution, and mode choice. The zonal interchange analysis of trip distribution provides origin-destination trip tables. Mode choice analysis tells which travelers will use which mode. To determine facility needs and costs and benefits, we need to know the number of travelers on each route and link of the network (a route is simply a chain of links between an origin and destination). We need to undertake traffic (or trip) assignment. Suppose there is a network of highways and transit systems and a proposed addition. We first want to know the present pattern of traffic delay and then what would happen if the addition were made.

== General Approaches ==
=== Long-standing techniques ===
The problem of estimating how many users are on each route is long standing. Planners started looking hard at it as freeways and expressways began to be developed. The freeway offered a superior level of service over the local street system, and diverted traffic from the local system. At first, diversion was the technique. Ratios of travel time were used, tempered by considerations of costs, comfort, and level of service.

The Chicago Area Transportation Study (CATS) researchers developed diversion curves for freeways versus local streets. There was much work in California also, for California had early experiences with freeway planning. In addition to work of a diversion sort, the CATS attacked some technical problems that arise when one works with complex networks. One result was the Bellman–Ford–Moore algorithm for finding shortest paths on networks.

The issue the diversion approach did not handle was the feedback from the quantity of traffic on links and routes. If a lot of vehicles try to use a facility, the facility becomes congested and travel time increases. Absent some way to consider feedback, early planning studies (actually, most in the period 1960-1975) ignored feedback. They used the Moore algorithm to determine shortest paths and assigned all traffic to shortest paths. That is called all or nothing assignment because either all of the traffic from i to j moves along a route or it does not.

The all-or-nothing or shortest path assignment is not trivial from a technical-computational view. Each traffic zone is connected to n - 1 zones, so there are numerous paths to be considered. In addition, we are ultimately interested in traffic on links. A link may be a part of several paths, and traffic along paths has to be summed link by link.

An argument can be made favoring the all-or-nothing approach. It goes this way: The planning study is to support investments so that a good level of service is available on all links. Using the travel times associated with the planned level of service, calculations indicate how traffic will flow once improvements are in place. Knowing the quantities of traffic on links, the capacity to be supplied to meet the desired level of service can be calculated.

=== Heuristic procedures ===
To take account of the effect of traffic loading on travel times and traffic equilibria, several heuristic calculation procedures were developed. One heuristic proceeds incrementally. The traffic to be assigned is divided into parts (usually 4). Assign the first part of the traffic. Compute new travel times and assign the next part of the traffic. The last step is repeated until all the traffic is assigned. The CATS used a variation on this; it assigned row by row in the O-D table.

The heuristic included in the FHWA collection of computer programs proceeds another way.

- 0. Start by loading all traffic using an all or nothing procedure.
- 1. Compute the resulting travel times and reassign traffic.
- 2. Now, begin to reassign using weights. Compute the weighted travel times in the previous two loadings and use those for the next assignment. The latest iteration gets a weight of 0.25 and the previous gets a weight of 0.75.
- 3. Continue.

These procedures seem to work "pretty well," but they are not exact.

=== Frank-Wolfe algorithm ===
Dafermos (1968) applied the Frank-Wolfe algorithm (1956, Florian 1976), which can be used to deal with the traffic equilibrium problem. Suppose we are considering a highway network. For each link there is a function stating the relationship between resistance and volume of traffic. The Bureau of Public Roads (BPR) developed a link (arc) congestion (or volume-delay, or link performance) function, which we will term S_{a}(v_{a})

$S_a \left( {v_a } \right) = t_a \left( {1 + 0.15\left( {\frac{{v_a }} {{c_a }}} \right)^4 } \right)$

- t_{a} = free flow travel time on link a per unit of time
- v_{a} = volume of traffic on link a per unit of time (somewhat more accurately: flow attempting to use link a).
- c_{a} = capacity of link a per unit of time
- S_{a}(v_{a}) is the average travel time for a vehicle on link a

There are other congestion functions. The CATS has long used a function different from that used by the BPR, but there seems to be little difference between results when the CATS and BPR functions are compared.

=== Equilibrium assignment ===
To assign traffic to paths and links we have to have rules, and there are the well-known Wardrop equilibrium conditions. The essence of these is that travelers will strive to find the shortest (least resistance) path from origin to destination, and network equilibrium occurs when no traveler can decrease travel effort by shifting to a new path. These are termed user optimal conditions, for no user will gain from changing travel paths once the system is in equilibrium.

The user optimum equilibrium can be found by solving the following nonlinear programming problem

$\min \sum_a {\int_0^{v_a} {S_a \left( x \right)} } dx$

subject to:

$v_a = \sum_i {\sum_j {\sum_r {\alpha _{ij}^{ar} x_{ij}^r } } }$

$\sum_r {x_{ij}^r = T_{ij} }$

$v_a \geq 0,\;x_{ij}^r \geq 0$

where $x_{ij}^r$ is the number of vehicles on path r from origin i to destination j. So constraint (2) says that all travel must take place –i = 1 ... n; j = 1 ... n

$\alpha _{ij}^{ar}$ = 1 if link a is on path r from i to j ; zero otherwise. So constraint (1) sums traffic on each link. There is a constraint for each link on the network. Constraint (3) assures no negative traffic.

=== Example ===
An example from Eash, Janson, and Boyce (1979) will illustrate the solution to the nonlinear program problem. There are two links from node 1 to node 2, and there is a resistance function for each link (see Figure 1). Areas under the curves in Figure 2 correspond to the integration from 0 to a in equation 1, they sum to 220,674. Note that the function for link b is plotted in the reverse direction.

$S_a = 15\left( {1 + 0.15\left( {\frac{{v_a }}{{1000}}} \right)^4 } \right)$

$S_b = 20\left( {1 + 0.15\left( {\frac{{v_b }}{{3000}}} \right)^4 } \right)$

$v_a + v_b = 8000$

Figure 1: Two Route Network

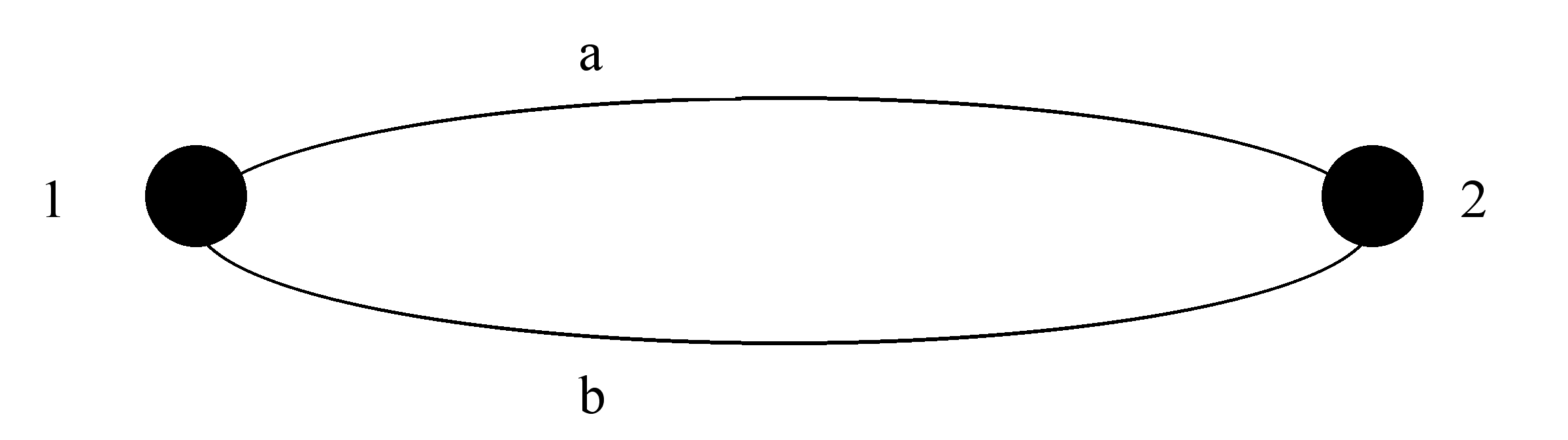
Figure 1 - Two Route Network

Figure 2: Graphical Solution to the Equilibrium Assignment Problem

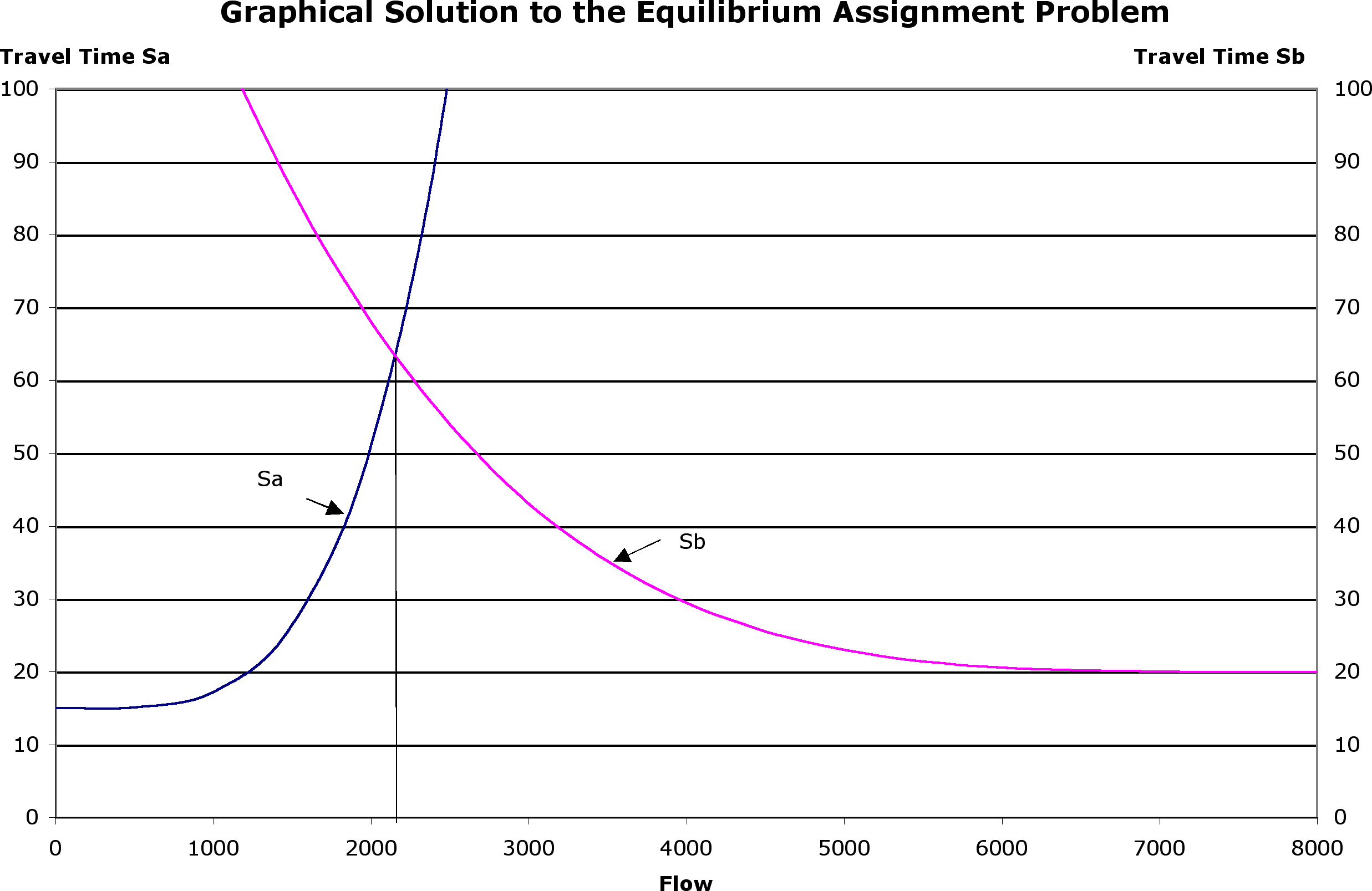
Figure 2 - Graphical Solution to the Equilibrium Assignment Problem

Figure 3: Allocation of Vehicles not Satisfying the Equilibrium Condition

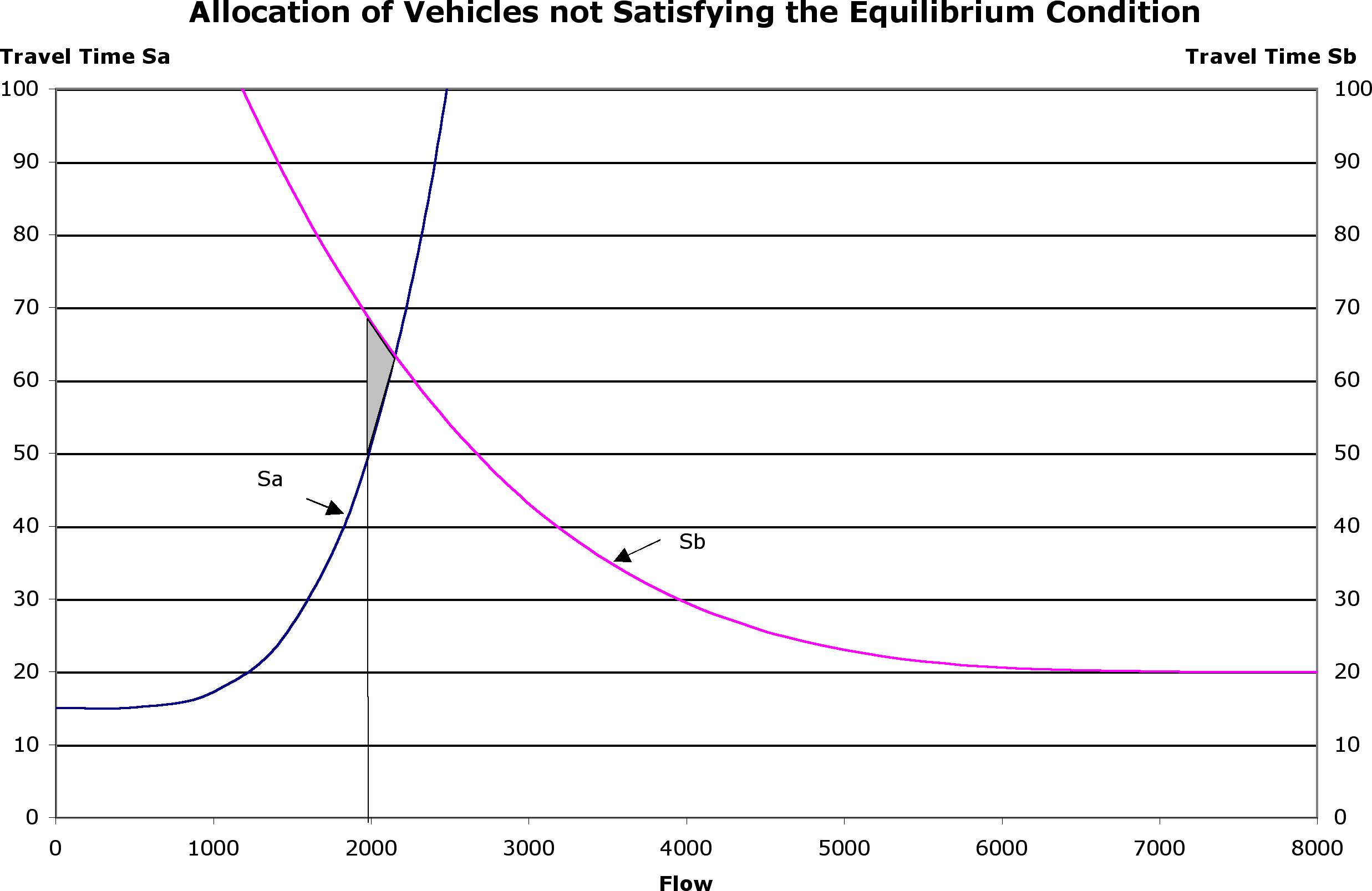
Figure 3 - Allocation of Vehicles not Satisfying the Equilibrium Condition

At equilibrium there are 2,152 vehicles on link a and 5847 on link b. Travel time is the same on each route: about 63.

Figure 3 illustrates an allocation of vehicles that is not consistent with the equilibrium solution. The curves are unchanged. But with the new allocation of vehicles to routes the shaded area has to be included in the solution, so the Figure 3 solution is larger than the solution in Figure 2 by the area of the shaded area.

== Integrating travel choices ==
The urban transportation planning model evolved as a set of steps to be followed, and models evolved for use in each step. Sometimes there were steps within steps, as was the case for the first statement of the Lowry model. In some cases, it has been noted that steps can be integrated. More generally, the steps abstract from decisions that may be made simultaneously, and it would be desirable to better replicate that in the analysis.

Disaggregate demand models were first developed to treat the mode choice problem. That problem assumes that one has decided to take a trip, where that trip will go, and at what time the trip will be made. They have been used to treat the implied broader context. Typically, a nested model will be developed, say, starting with the probability of a trip being made, then examining the choice among places, and then mode choice. The time of travel is a bit harder to treat.

Wilson's doubly constrained entropy model has been the point of departure for efforts at the aggregate level. That model contains the constraint

$t_{ij}c_{ij}=C$

where the $c_{ij}$ are the link travel costs, $t_{ij}$ refers to traffic on a link, and C is a resource constraint to be sized when fitting the model with data. Instead of using that form of the constraint, the monotonically increasing resistance function used in traffic assignment can be used. The result determines zone-to-zone movements and assigns traffic to networks, and that makes much sense from the way one would imagine the system works – zone-to-zone traffic depends on the resistance occasioned by congestion.

Alternatively, the link resistance function may be included in the objective function (and the total cost function eliminated from the constraints).

A generalized disaggregate choice approach has evolved as has a generalized aggregate approach. The large question is that of the relations between them. When we use a macro model, we would like to know the disaggregate behavior it represents. If we are doing a micro analysis, we would like to know the aggregate implications of the analysis.

Wilson derives a gravity-like model with weighted parameters that say something about the attractiveness of origins and destinations. Without too much math we can write probability of choice statements based on attractiveness, and these take a form similar to some varieties of disaggregate demand models.

== Integrating travel demand with route assignment ==
It has long been recognized that travel demand is influenced by network supply. The example of a new bridge opening where none was before inducing additional traffic has been noted for centuries. Much research has gone into developing methods for allowing the forecasting system to directly account for this phenomenon. Evans (1974) published a doctoral dissertation on a mathematically rigorous combination of the gravity distribution model with the equilibrium assignment model. The earliest citation of this integration is the work of Irwin and Von Cube, as related by Florian et al. (1975), who comment on the work of Evans:

"The work of Evans resembles somewhat the algorithms developed by Irwin and Von Cube ['Capacity Restraint in Multi-Travel Mode Assignment Programs' H.R.B. Bulletin 347 (1962)] for a transportation study of Toronto. Their work allows for feedback between congested assignment and trip distribution, although they apply sequential procedures. Starting from an initial solution of the distribution problem, the interzonal trips are assigned to the initial shortest routes. For successive iterations, new shortest routes are computed, and their lengths are used as access times for input the distribution model. The new interzonal flows are then assigned in some proportion to the routes already found. The procedure is stopped when the interzonal times for successive iteration are quasi-equal."

Florian et al. proposed a somewhat different method for solving the combined distribution assignment, applying directly the Frank-Wolfe algorithm. Boyce et al. (1988) summarize the research on Network Equilibrium Problems, including the assignment with elastic demand.

== Discussion ==
A three link problem can not be solved graphically, and most transportation network problems involve a large numbers of nodes and links. Eash et al., for instance, studied the road net on DuPage County where there were about 30,000 one-way links and 9,500 nodes. Because problems are large, an algorithm is needed to solve the assignment problem, and the Frank-Wolfe algorithm (with various modern modifications since first published) is used. Start with an all or nothing assignment, and then follow the rule developed by Frank-Wolfe to iterate toward the minimum value of the objective function. (The algorithm applies successive feasible solutions to achieve convergence to the optimal solution. It uses an efficient search procedure to move the calculation rapidly toward the optimal solution.) Travel times correspond to the dual variables in this programming problem.

It is interesting that the Frank-Wolfe algorithm was available in 1956. Its application was developed in 1968, and it took almost another two decades before the first equilibrium assignment algorithm was embedded in commonly used transportation planning software (Emme and Emme/2, developed by Florian and others in Montreal). We would not want to draw any general conclusion from the slow application observation, mainly because we can find counter examples about the pace and pattern of technique development. For example, the simplex method for the solution of linear programming problems was worked out and widely applied prior to the development of much of programming theory.

The problem statement and algorithm have general applications across civil engineering -– hydraulics, structures, and construction. (See Hendrickson and Janson 1984).

== Empirical Studies of Route Choice ==
Route assignment models are based at least to some extent on empirical studies of how people choose routes in a network. Such studies are generally focused on a particular mode, and make use of either stated preference or revealed preference models.

=== Bicycle ===
Cyclists have been found to prefer designated bike lanes and avoid steep hills.

=== Public Transport ===
Public transport has long been considered in the context of route assignment and many studies have been conducted on transit route choice. Among other factors, transit users attempt to minimize total travel time, time or distance walking, and number of transfers.

== See also ==
- Route choice (disambiguation)

== General References ==
- Dafermos, Stella. C. and F.T. Sparrow The Traffic Assignment Problem for a General Network." J. of Res. of the National Bureau of Standards, 73B, pp. 91-118. 1969.
- Florian, Michael ed., Traffic Equilibrium Methods, Springer-Verlag, 1976.
- Eash, Ronald, Bruce N. Janson, and David Boyce Equilibrium Trip Assignment: Advantages and Implications for Practice, Transportation Research Record 728, pp. 1–8, 1979.
- Evans, Suzanne P. . "Derivation and Analysis of Some Models for Combining Trip Distribution and Assignment." Transportation Research, Vol 10, pp 37–57 1976
- Hendrickson, C.T. and B.N. Janson, "A Common Network Flow Formulation to Several Civil Engineering Problems" Civil Engineering Systems 1(4), pp. 195–203, 1984
