= Leslie C. Francis =

Leslie C Francis

Les Francis
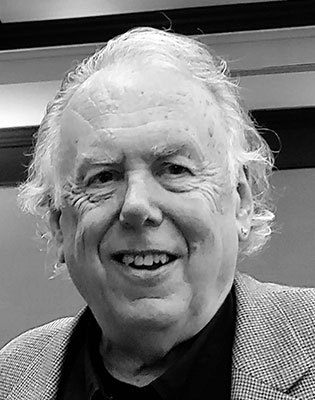
- Leslie C. "Les" Francis

Deputy Assistant to the President / Deputy White Chief of Staff
- In office 1977–1979
- President: Jimmy Carter
- Preceded by: Dick Cheney
- Succeeded by: Mike Deaver

DNC Executive Director
- In office 1979–1980
- Succeeded by: Jane Eidenburg

DCCC Executive Director
- In office 1991–1992
- Preceded by: Richard Bates
- Succeeded by: Genie Norris

Personal details
- Born: Leslie C. "Les" Francis; February 13, 1943 (age 82) San Jose, California, U.S.
- Party: Democratic Party
- Spouse: Shari Francis
- Children: 3
- Education: San Jose State University (BA)

Leslie C. Francis (born February 13, 1943) is an American political consultant and public affairs advisor. He served as Chief of Staff to Representative Norman Y. Mineta (D-CA), Deputy Assistant to the President and Deputy White House Chief of Staff in the Carter Administration, Executive Director of the Democratic National Committee (DNC), Staff Director and acting campaign manager in the 1980 Carter-Mondale reelection campaign, and Executive Director of the Democratic Congressional Campaign Committee (DCCC). Francis served as Vice President for Communications and Public Affairs of the Educational Testing Service (ETS) for a term of five years.

== Early life and education ==
Les Francis was born in San Jose, California to Leonard C. Francis and Dorothy A. (Bernard) Francis. He was educated in public schools in San Jose, including Abraham Lincoln High School, where he served as a class and student body officer, and was recognized with the "Outstanding Graduate" award/scholarship by the California Savings and Loan League

Les Francis graduated from San Jose State University in 1965 with a degree in Social Science, with an emphasis on political science and history. He also received his General Secondary Teaching Credential from SJSU in 1966. While in college, Francis served on the Academic Fairness Committee and was active in, and a leader of the statewide Student California Teachers Association (StudentCTA).

== Political career ==
=== Early career ===
Upon receipt of his teaching credential, Francis was offered and accepted a position with the California Teachers Association (CTA), joining the CTA professional staff in January 1967, and thus becoming the youngest person ever hired by CTA in a professional staff capacity. He worked as a member of CTA's Department of Teacher Education and Professional Standards and served as the principal adviser to the association's student programs.

During that period (1967–69), he played an instrumental role in the national campaign to pass the 26th amendment to the U.S. Constitution to permit 18-year-olds the right to vote, an effort that was spearheaded and funded by the National Education Association. NEA hired Francis in early 1969 to launch the organization's Project 18, and to help found the Youth Franchise Coalition (YFC), which became the national "umbrella group" that led the effort to lower the voting age.

For the 1969–70 academic year, Francis returned to his alma mater, San Jose State University, as adviser to the university's international student population. He also was a candidate for the California State Assembly in the 1970 Democratic primary. As Francis puts it "In a field of seven candidates for the nomination, I beat the hell out of the guy who came in seventh!"

In September 1970, Francis rejoined the staff of CTA/NEA, becoming an organizational development and crisis management specialist in Orange County, Calif., where he stayed until moving to the nation's capital in 1975.

During his year on the faculty of SJSU, and in his short-lived life in elective politics, Les Francis became close friends with, and political ally of, a young City Councilman and Vice Mayor, Norman Y. Mineta. When Mineta ran successfully for Mayor in 1971, Francis served as a key advisor, commuting frequently to San Jose from Orange County. He played a similar role in Mineta's (again successful) campaign for the U.S. House of Representatives in 1974.

Immediately upon his election, Mineta invited Les Francis to be his chief of staff, overseeing both the Congressman's legislative office on Capitol Hill, but also providing general supervision over the staff operation in the district (San Jose and nearby suburbs). Francis moved, with his young family, to Washington, DC, where they settled in nearby Alexandria, VA.

Norm Mineta served in Congress as part of the large group of newly elected democratic members following the post-Watergate election. During this period, Francis became acquainted with several of the new members and their Washington, D.C.-based staff

=== Carter Administration (1977–1979) ===
In the summer of 1975, when working for Representative Mineta on Capitol Hill, Francis had a chance meeting with the former Governor of Georgia, Jimmy Carter, who had already launched his longshot presidential candidacy. The brief encounter led to a longer conversation the same evening, and Francis became an early and committed Carter supporter.

He took vacation time to work for Carter in the Pennsylvania primary and at the Democratic National Convention in New York. Later, he took a leave of absence from his Congressional position to run the Carter/Mondale field operation in California. After Carter's election, Francis returned to Mineta's office and expected to stay there another two or four years, and then return to California. However, he was offered a position in the White House Office of Congressional Liaison, serving as a Deputy to the head of the office and Assistant to the President, Frank Moore.

The position was primarily an "inside job", as opposed to those who spent their time lobbying for the President's program in the House and Senate. Francis and his office were the primary day-to-day link between Congressional Liaison and other White House units (Domestic Policy, OMB, Cabinet Affairs, Press, etc.), as well as with the various Cabinet and agency legislative operations. He and his colleagues coordinated the inter-agency task forces directing presidential priority efforts, wrote a highly confidential Weekly Legislative Report for the President, and took on "other duties as assigned."

== Career ==
In 1981, Francis launched his own business, The FMR Group, which was a pioneer in the grassroots lobbying field. The firm, acquired by Winner & Associates in 1993, was known for its innovative and effective constituency-development efforts. Francis and his firm won national recognition from the Public Relations Society of America and the American Association of Political Consultants.

In addition to managing or consulting dozens of initiative and referendums campaigns over several decades, Francis served as a staff member, manager, or senior adviser in campaigns for almost every office from city council to president. At different times in his career, he has also served as the Executive Director of the Democratic National Committee (1980–81) and the Democratic Congressional Campaign Committee (1991–92).

In addition to his work in political and public affairs, Francis has remained active in the education arena and a variety of volunteer activities. He has served as a board member of several nonprofit organizations and educational institutions, including the Council for Excellence in Government, Congressional Management Foundation, the Civic Mission of Schools campaign, the Partnership for 21st Century Skills, and the Committee for the Study of the American Electorate. Francis has also served as a volunteer consultant to the National Democratic Institute for International Affairs and has advised democratic movements and parties in Northern Ireland, the Czech Republic, Slovakia, Romania, Bolivia, Hong Kong, Taiwan, and Bosnia. Francis has also served as an adjunct faculty member of political communications at George Washington University, where he teaches courses in campaign communications and political campaign ethics.

With his extensive and varied experience in politics and government at the local, state, and federal levels, Francis is a frequent source for journalists as they cover or analyze current events. He has authored and co-authored articles for many of the country's leading newspapers and websites, including The New York Times, The Washington Post, The Sacramento Bee, the San Jose Mercury-News, the Frum Forum, Huffington Post, and Real Clear Politics, among others. Francis has been a guest lecturer at the University of California-Berkeley, the University of Pennsylvania, Syracuse University, American University, the University of Virginia, Harvard's Kennedy School, Stanford University, San Jose State, and the Close Up Foundation.
