= Gravity model =

Gravity models are used in various social sciences to predict and describe certain behaviors that mimic gravitational interaction as described in Isaac Newton's laws of gravity. Generally, the social science models contain some elements of mass and distance, which lends them to the metaphor of physical gravity. A gravity model provides an estimate of the volume of flows of, for example, goods, services, or people between two or more locations. This could be the movement of people between cities or the volume of trade between countries.

A gravity model cannot accurately predict flows, but is instead a measure against which actual observed values can be compared, highlighting where those flows are unexpectedly high or low.

Social science gravity models:

- Gravity model of trade
- Trip distribution
- Gravity model of migration
- Two-step floating catchment area (2SFCA) method
- Reilly's law of retail gravitation
