= Gravity model of migration =

Model used to predict the degree of migration between two places

The gravity model of migration is a model in urban geography derived from Newton's law of gravity, and used to predict the degree of migration interaction between two places. In 1941, astrophysicist John Q. Stewart applied Newton's law to the social sciences, establishing a theoretical foundation for the field of social physics. He recognized that the law of gravity could be used to explain demographic phenomena by examining empirical patterns related to distance in social interactions. This insight paved the way for further exploration of how physical principles could model social dynamics.

== Overview ==
When used geographically, the words 'bodies' and 'masses' are replaced by 'locations' and 'importance' respectively, where importance can be measured in terms of population numbers, gross domestic product, or other appropriate variables. The gravity model of migration is therefore based upon the idea that as the importance of one or both of the location increases, there will also be an increase in movement between them. The further apart the two locations are, however, the movement between them will be less. This phenomenon is known as distance decay.

The gravity model can be used to estimate:

- Traffic flow
- Migration between two areas
- The number of people likely to use one central place

The gravity model can also be used to determine the sphere of influence of each central place by estimating where the breaking point between the two settlements will be. An example of this is the point at which customers find it preferable, because of distance, time and expense considerations, to travel to one center rather than the other.

The gravity model can be used to measure accessibility to services (e.g., access to health care). A special case of gravity model is the two-step floating catchment area method (2SFCA), which is popular in health care research.

The gravity model was expanded by William J. Reilly in 1931 into Reilly's law of retail gravitation to calculate the breaking point between two places where customers will be drawn to one or another of two competing commercial centers.

Opponents of the gravity model explain it can not be confirmed scientifically, that it is only based on observation. They also state that the gravity model is an unfair method of predicting movement because of its biased toward historic ties and the largest population centers. Thus, while they often explain the status quo well, they struggle to analyze the contributions of related variables and predict how changes in these variables would lead to changes in migration patterns.

== See also ==
- Gravity model of trade – uses the same approach for modelling trade flows between two locations and discusses variants of the initial gravity model
- Radiation law for human mobility
- Heuristic

== Literature ==
- Erin H. Fouberg; Alexander B. Murphy; Harm J. de Blij (2012). Human Geography, People, Place, and Culture. John Wiley and Sons. ISBN 978-1118175996.
- Rodrigue, J.-P., Comtois, C., Slack, B. (2009). The Geography of Transport Systems. London, New York: Routledge. ISBN 978-0-415-48324-7.
- Capoani, L. (2023). "Review of the gravity model: origins and critical analysis of its theoretical development". SN Business & Economics. 3: 95. doi:10.1007/s43546-023-00461-0.
- Bijak, J. (2006). Forecasting International Migration: Selected Theories, Models, and Methods. http://www.cefmr.pan.pl/docs/cefmr_wp_2006-04.pdf
