= Route choice =

Route choice may refer to:

- Path selection in Network routing
- Route choice (orienteering)
- Route assignment
