= Demographic gravitation =

Social effect

Demographic gravitation is a concept of "social physics", introduced by Princeton University astrophysicist John Quincy Stewart in 1947. It is an attempt to use equations and notions of classical physics, such as gravity, to seek simplified insights and even laws of demographic behaviour for large numbers of human beings. A basic conception within it is that large numbers of people, in a city for example, actually behave as an attractive force for other people to migrate there. It has been related to W. J. Reilly's law of retail gravitation, George Kingsley Zipf's Demographic Energy, and to the theory of trip distribution through gravity models.

Writing in the journal Sociometry, Stewart set out an "agenda for social physics." Comparing the microscopic versus macroscopic viewpoints in the methodology of formulating physical laws, he made an analogy with the social sciences:

Fortunately for physics, the macroscopic approach was the commonsense one, and the early investigators – Boyle, Charles, Gay-Lussac – were able to establish the laws of gases. The situation with respect to "social physics" is reversed... If Robert Boyle had taken the attitude of many social scientists, he would not have been willing to measure the pressure and volume of a sample of air until an encyclopedic history of its molecules had been compiled. Boyle did not even know that air contained argon and helium but he found a very important law.

Stewart proceeded to apply Newtonian formulae of gravitation to that of "the average interrelations of people" on a wide geographic scale, elucidating such notions as "the demographic force of attraction," demographic energy, force, potential and gradient.

== Key equations ==
The following are some of the key equations (with plain English paraphrases) from his article in sociometry:

$$F = \frac{N_1 N_2}{d^2}$$

(Demographic force = (population 1 multiplied by population 2) divided by (distance squared))

$$E = \frac{N_1 N_2}{d}$$

(Demographic energy = (population 1, multiplied by population 2) divided by distance; this is also Zipf's determinant)

$$PN_1 = \frac{N_2}{d}$$

(Demographic potential of population at point 1 = population at point 2, divided by distance)

$$P = \frac{N}{d}$$

(Demographic potential in general = population divided by distance, in persons per mile)

$$\text{gradient} = \frac{N}{m^2}$$

(Demographic gradient = persons per (i.e. divided by) square mile)

The potential of population at any point is equivalent to the measure of proximity of people at that point (this also has relevance to Georgist economic rent theory Economic rent#Land rent).

For comparison, Reilly's retail gravity equilibrium (or Balance/Break Point) is paraphrased as:

$$\frac{N_1}{d^2} = \frac{N_2}{d^2}$$

(Population 1 divided by (distance to balance, squared) = Population 2 / (distance to balance, squared))

Recently, a stochastic version has been proposed according to which the probability $p_j$ of a site $j$ to become urban is given by

$$p_j=C\frac{\sum_k w_k d_{j,k}^{-\gamma}}{\sum_k d_{j,k}^{-\gamma}}$$

where $w_k=1$ for urban sites and $w_k=0$ otherwise, $d_{j,k}$ is the distance between sites $j$ and $k$, and $C$ controls the overall growth-rate. The parameter $\gamma$ determines the degree of compactness.

== See also ==
- Reilly's law of retail gravitation
- Trip distribution: gravity model
- George Kingsley Zipf's demographic energy
- Central place theory
- Johann Heinrich von Thünen's spatial economics
- Walther Christaller's central place theory
- Alfred Weber's least cost location theory.
- Economic rent: Land rent.
- John Quincy Stewart, 1947. Empirical Mathematical Rules Concerning the Distribution and Equilibrium of Population, Geographical Review, Vol 37, 461–486.
- John Quincy Stewart, 1950. Potential of Population and its Relationship to Marketing. In: Theory in Marketing, R. Cox and W. Alderson (Eds) ( Richard D. Irwin, Inc., Homewood, Illinois).
- Zipf, G. K., 1946. The P1 P2/D Hypothesis: On the Intercity Movement of Persons. American Sociological Review, vol. 11, Oct
- Zipf, G. K., 1949. Human Behaviour and the Principle of Least Effort. Massachusetts
