= Primary care service area =

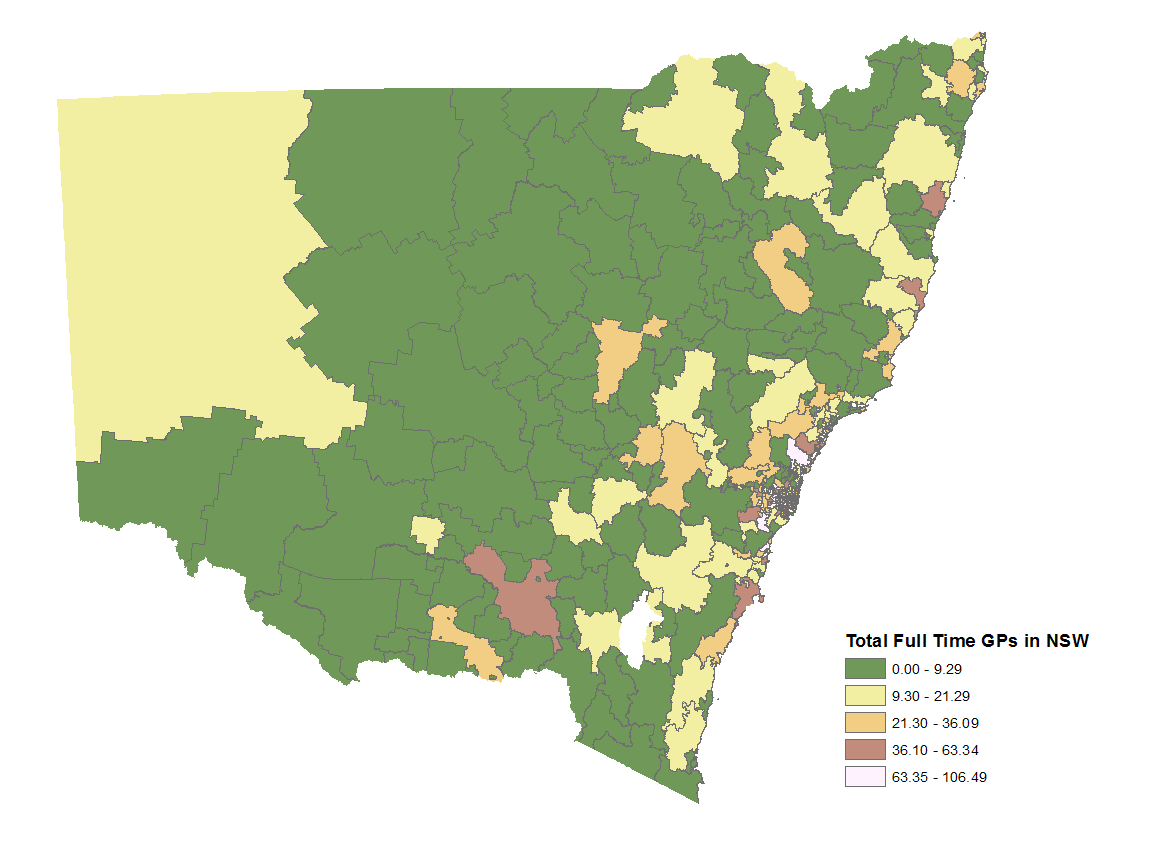
Total Full Time Workload Equivalent General Practitioners in New South Wales, Australia by Primary Care Service Areas

Primary Care Service Areas are geographic areas that are self-sufficient markets of primary care. These areas are designed in a manner such that the majority of patients living in these areas use primary care services from within the area. This ensures that any geographic targeting of policies and resources reach the patients they are meant for. These geographies have been created in Australia, United States and Switzerland using big data and Geographic information systems. In Australia, while they have been developed for the state of New South Wales, they have not found application among policymakers, where, as of 2016 much larger geographies called Primary Health Networks are used for primary care management. However, they have found an especially wide audience amongst policymakers and researchers in the United States, where they were first developed. Thus for example the Health Resources and Services Administration uses them to designate areas of workforce shortage. Primary Care Service Areas are thus for example an appropriate geography for measuring primary care physician supply or geographic access to General practitioners.

== See also ==
- Bonded medical place
- Gravity model of migration
- two-step floating catchment area (2SFCA) method
