= Two-step floating catchment area method =

Information modeling system

The two-step floating catchment area (2SFCA) method is a method for combining a number of related types of information into a single, immediately meaningful, index that allows comparisons to be made across different locations. Its importance lies in the improvement over considering the individual sources of information separately, where none on its own provides an adequate summary.

== Background ==
The two-step floating catchment area (2SFCA) method is a special case of a gravity model of spatial interaction that was developed to measure spatial accessibility to primary care physicians. 2SFCA is based on the accessibility measure developed by Shen (1998), who used it to compare accessibility to jobs among workers residing in different locations and traveling by different transportation means, and more generally, to measure accessibility to spatially distributed opportunities that have capacity limitations (i.e., rival goods). 2SFCA was inspired by the spatial decomposition idea first proposed by Radke and Mu (2000).

The 2SFCA method not only has most of the advantages of a gravity model, but is also intuitive to interpret, as it uses essentially a special form of physician-to-population ratio (this interpretation is based on the mathematical proof by Shen (1998)). It is easy to implement in a GIS environment. In essence, applying the accessibility measure formulated by Shen (1998) the 2SFCA method is an automated procedure for measuring spatial accessibility as a ratio of primary-care physicians to population, combining two steps:

1. it first assesses “physician availability” at the physicians' (supply) locations as the ratio of physicians to their surrounding population (i.e., within a threshold travel time from the physicians)
2. it sums up the ratios (i.e., physician availability derived in the first step) around (i.e., within the same threshold travel time from) each residential (demand) location.

It has been recently enhanced by considering distance decay within catchments and called the enhanced two-step floating catchment area (E2SFCA) method.

Furthermore, the use of capping certain services according to nearby population size, can improve the accuracy when analyzing across areas of different environments (i.e. rural and urban).

The method has been applied to other related public health issues, such as access to healthy food retailers.

== See also ==
- Primary care service area
- Gravity model of migration
