= Radiation law for human mobility =

The radiation law is way of modeling human mobility (geographic mobility, human migration) and it gives better empirical predictions than the gravity model of migration which is widely used in this subject.

== Intercity mobility ==
Historical human migration occurred through war-driven displacement or geographic exploration. Subsequent advancements in transportation have reduced travel costs and durations, enabling rapid intercontinental transit. Increased utilization of transportation and communication networks has created a need to analyze human mobility patterns and their impact on network infrastructure.

== The radiation model ==
Radiation models appeared first in physics to study the process of energetic particles or waves travel through vacuum. The model in the social science describes the flows of people between different locations. Daily commuting is the major part of the flows, so modeling job seeking has to be an important part of the model and so it is in the radiation model. People look for jobs in every county starting with their own home county. The number of open jobs $n_\text{jobs}$ depends on the size of the resident population $n$. The potential employment opportunity (e.g. conditions, income, working hour, etc.) is $z$ with the distribution of $p(z)$. Then, for each county $n/n_\text{jobs}$ job opportunities are assigned, which are random draws from the $p(z)$ distribution. Individuals then chooses the job which is closest to their home county and provides the highest $z$. Thus, they take into account the proximity to their home county and the benefits it can provide. This optimization gives the migration flows (called commuting fluxes) between counties across the country. This is analogous to the model in physics that describes the radiation and absorption process, that's why it's called the radiation model. An important feature of the model is that the average flux between two counties does not depend on the benefit distribution, the number of job opportunities and the total number of commuters. The fundamental equation of the radiation model gives the average flux between two counties,

$$\langle T_{ij}\rangle = T_i\frac{m_i n_j}{(m_i+s_{ij})(m_i + n_{j} + s_{ij})}.$$

where $T_i$ is the total number of commuters from county $i$, $m_i$ and $n_j$ are the population in county $i$ and $j$ respectively, and $s_{ij}$ is the total population in the circle centered at $i$ and touching $j$ excluding the source and the destination population. The model is not static as the Gravity model, and has clear implications which can be empirically verified.

=== Example ===
The population density around Utah is much lower than around Alabama and so are the job opportunities, given that the population of the two states is the same. Thus, the fundamental equation implies that people from Utah have to travel further to find suitable jobs on average than people from Alabama, and indeed, this is what the data shows. The Gravity model gives bad predictions both on short and long distance commuting, while the prediction of the Radiation model is close to the census data. Further empirical testing shows that the Radiation model underestimates the flow in case of big cities, but generalizing the fundamental equation the model can give at least as good predictions as the Gravity model.

== Other forms of the radiation model ==
In 1971 famed economist William Alonso produced a working paper that describes a mathematical model of human mobility. In that manuscript Alonso remarks: "It is almost as if an urban area were a radioactive body, emitting particles at a steady rate[.]" In addition to many of the same mathematical terms used by Simini et al., Alonso's radiation model includes measures of climate (degree days) and wealth (per capita income) for both the emitting and receiving locales, but only includes the distance between these urban areas as opposed to a radial measure of intervening population density.

== Other models of human mobility ==
The most influential model to describe trade patterns, and in a similar way, describe human mobility is the gravity model of trade. The model predicts, that the migration flow is proportional to the population of the cities/countries, and it is reciprocal in a quadratic order in the distance between them. Although, it is an intuitive description of the flows, and it is used to describe gravitational forces in physics, in terms of migration it does not perform well empirically. Moreover, the model just simply assumes the given functional form without any theoretical background.
