= Travel behavior =

Behaviors of people over geography

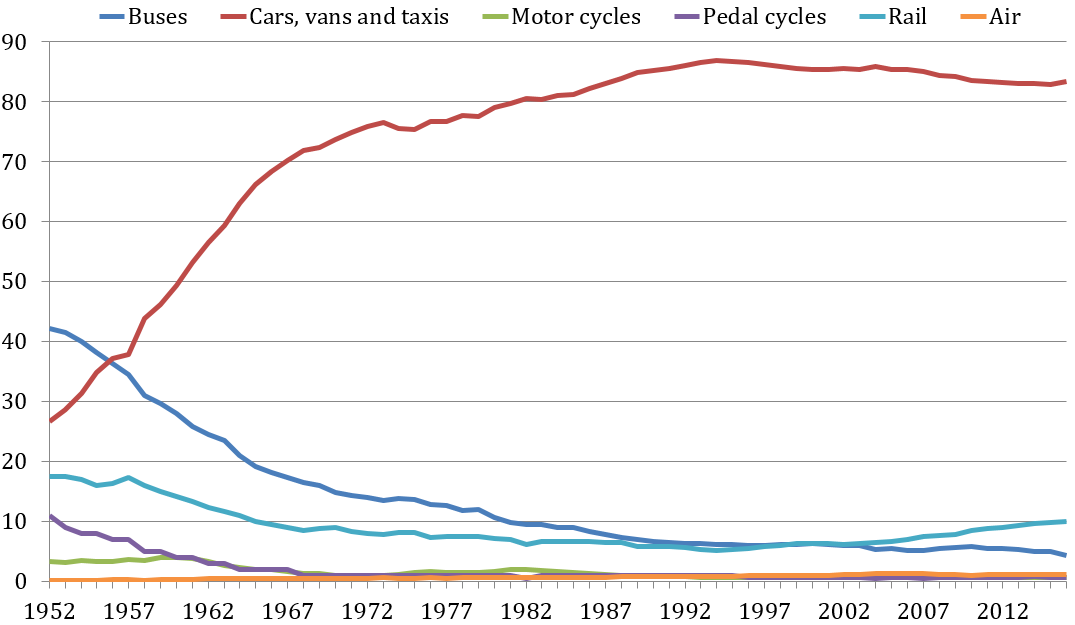
Trips modal share within the UK, 1952-2014

Travel behavior is the study of what people do over geography, and how people use transport.

== Questions studied ==
The questions studied in travel behavior are broad, and are probed through activity and time-use research studies, and surveys of travelers designed to reveal attitudes, behaviors and the gaps between them in relation to the sociological and environmental impacts of travel.

- How many trips do people make?
- Where do they go? (What is the destination?)
- What mode do they take?
- Who accompanies whom?
- When is the trip made? What is the schedule?
- What is the sequence or pattern of trips?
- What route choices do people make?
- Why do people travel? (Why can't people stay at home and remote work or teleshop?)
- To what degree are people aware of the environmental and climate impacts of their travel choices?
- To what degree and how do people rationalize the environmental and climate impacts causes by their travel?
- Where changes in travel behavior would be beneficial to society, how might those changes be promoted?

Other behavioral aspects of traveling, such as letting people get off before entering a vehicle, queueing behavior, etc. (See for example Passenger behavior in Shanghai)

== Data ==
These questions can be answered descriptively using a travel diary, often part of a travel survey or travel behavior inventory. Large metropolitan areas typically only do such surveys once every decade, though some cities are conducting panel surveys, which track the same people year after year. Such repeated surveys are useful because they yield different answers than surveys at a single point in time.

That data is generally used to estimate transportation planning models, so that transport analysts can make predictions about people who haven't been surveyed. This is important in forecasting traffic, which depends on future changes to road networks, land use patterns, and policies.

Some years ago it was recognized that behavioral research was limited by data, and a special data set was developed to aid research: The Baltimore Disaggregate Data Set which is the result an in depth survey, ca. 1977. Its title indicates today's emphasis on disaggregated rather than aggregated data. This particular data set is believed lost. A small program to preserve and make available on the web these travel behavior surveys, the Metropolitan Travel Survey Archive, is now under way at the University of Minnesota. There is also the National Personal Transportation Survey (later National Household Travel Survey), conducted every five years or so, but with much less spatial detail.

Today, the best source of information about travel behavior is a Household Travel Survey. In this type of data collection the sampling unit is the household and all its members because people interact the most with other people with whom they share a residence. Data on household characteristics, person characteristics, and a daily diary constitute the Household Travel Survey. The diary can be a trip diary (in which a person records every trip made in a day), or a place-based diary (in which a person records every location visited, the trips made to reach these location and the activities completed), or a time use diary (in which a person everything he/she does in day). Examples include the National Household Travel Survey, the California Household Travel Survey, The Puget Sound Travel Survey. Data from these surveys can be found at https://www.nrel.gov/transportation/secure-transportation-data/.

== Travel behavior and activity analysis ==
Analysis of travel behavior from the home can answer the question: How does the family participate in modern society. Consider two non-observable extremes. At one extreme we have the non-specialized household. It does everything for itself, and no travel is required. Ultimate specialization is the other extreme; travel is required for all things. Observed households are somewhere in between. The "in between" position of households might be thought of as the consequence of two matters.

1. There is social and economic structure – the organization of society. To participate in this society, the household specializes its occupations, education, social activities, etc.
2. The extent to which members of the household specialize turns on their attributes and resources.

Moore (1964) has observed that increasing specialization in all things is the chief feature of social change. Considering social changes, one might observe that 100 years ago things were less specialized compared to today. So we would expect lots of change in household travel over the time period. Data are not very good, but the travel time aspect of what's available seems contrary to the expectation, travel hasn't changed much. For instance, the time spent on the journey to work may have been stable for centuries (the travel budget hypothesis). Here are some travel time comparisons from John Robinson (1986).

Table: Minutes per day spent in travel
| | Men | | Women |
|---|---|---|---|---|
| Activity | 1975 | 1985 | 1975 | 1985 |
| Work Travel | 25 | 31 | 9 | 17 |
| Family Travel | 33 | 31 | 33 | 33 |
| Leisure Travel | 27 | 33 | 21 | 23 |
| Total | 85 | 94 | 63 | 73 |

Most travel behavior analysis concerns demand issues and do not touch very much on supply issues. Yet when we observe travel from a home, we are certainly observing some sort of market clearing process – demand and supply are matched.

== History of travel behavior analysis ==
Analytic work on travel behavior can be dated from Liepmann (1945). Liepmann obtained and analyzed 1930s data on worker travel in England. Many of the insights current today were found by Liepmann: time spent, ride sharing, etc. Most academics date modern work from advances in mode choice analysis made in the 1970s. This created much excitement, and after some years an International Association for Travel Behaviour Research emerged. There are about 150 members of the Association; it holds a conference every three years. The proceedings of those conferences yield a nice record of advances in the field. The proceedings also provide a record of topics of lasting interest and of changing priorities. Mode choice received priority early on, but in the main today's work is not so much on theory as it is on practice. Hagerstrand (1970) developed a time and space path analysis, often called the time-space prism.

== Gender difference in travel patterns ==
On November 18–20, 2004, Transportation Research Board (TRB) held its third conference in Chicago, Illinois, with an interest in advancing the understanding of women's issues in transportation. One of the presented studies, conducted by Nobis et al., revealed that the gender difference in travel patterns is linked to employment status, household structure, child care, and maintenance tasks. They found that travel patterns of men and women are much similar when considering single families; the differences are greater once males and females are compared in multi-person households without children; and are the highest once they live in households with children. Over the past two decades numerous studies have been conducted on travel behavior showing gender as an influential factor in travel decision making.

== Travel surveys ==
A travel survey (or travel diary or travel behavior inventory) is a survey of individual travel behavior. Most surveys collect information about an individual (socio-economic, demographic, etc.), their household (size, structure, relationships), and a diary of their journeys on a given day (their start and end location, start and end time, mode of travel, accompaniment and purpose of travel).

Major travel surveys are conducted in metropolitan areas typically once a decade. Some regions, notably metropolitan Seattle, Washington, conduct a panel survey, which interviews the same people year after year, to see how their particular behavior evolves over time.

=== Recent or continuous city-wide travel surveys ===
Auckland, New Zealand - The Auckland travel survey was conducted in 2006 and involved 6,000 households in the greater Auckland region.

Brisbane, Australia - The South East Queensland Travel Survey collects travel data in the Greater Brisbane region and the neighbouring areas of Gold Coast and Sunshine Coast. The continuous survey commenced in 2003 and surveys around 6,000 households every two years.

Hobart, Australia - The Greater Hobart Household Travel Survey collects information from 200 households each month.

London, United Kingdom - The London Travel Demand Survey covers 8,000 households annually. Data is collected via face-to-face interviews.

Sydney, Australia - The continuous Household Travel Survey collects travel data annually for approximately 3,500 households in the Sydney Greater Metropolitan Region.

Washington, United States - The Metropolitan Washington Council of Governments conducted a 10,000 household survey in 2007.

=== Recent or continuous regional travel surveys ===
Greater Golden Horseshoe, Canada - the Transportation Tomorrow Survey (TTS) has been conducted every five years since 1986, surveying approximately 5% of households across the region. The 2016 TTS is one of the largest and most comprehensive travel surveys in North America, comprising a dataset of 162,708 surveys conducted online and by phone.

=== Recent or continuous country-wide travel surveys ===
Denmark's most recent National Travel was initiated in 2006 and has been going on continuously since then. The interviews are conducted using the internet and telephone interviews.

Germany is conducting its National Travel Survey since 1994 on a yearly basis. Each household member fills in a travel diary in which he records each trip made during the course of one week. Despite this yearly survey there is another non regular scheduled survey which is conducted again in 2008. 25,000 households are expected to participate.

The Netherlands National Travel Survey surveyed around 34,500 households in 2003. The survey has been conducted yearly since 1985, but with some changes in methodology. Survey forms are mailed out, with follow-up motivational phone calls.

In New Zealand the Ministry of Transport annually surveys 4,600 households for a two-day period. Data is collected via face to face interviews.

The United Kingdom Department for Transport conducts the National Travel Survey

The United States last conducted the National Household Travel Survey in 2017.

South Africa conducted its first National Household Travel Survey in 2003. Successful interviews were held with 45,000 households.

Sweden's most recent National Travel Survey (RES) was conducted in 2006-06.

== See also ==
- Hypermobility
- Metropolitan Travel Survey Archive
- Transportation planning
- Willingness to pay
