= Alan Voorhees =

American engineer

Alan M. Voorhees
- Born: Alan Manners Voorhees; December 17, 1922; Highland Park, New Jersey, U.S.
- Died: December 18, 2005 (aged 83); Richmond, Virginia, U.S.
- Education: Rensselaer Polytechnic Institute (B.S.); Massachusetts Institute of Technology (M.C.P.); Yale University
- Spouse: Nathalie P. Voorhees
- Awards: Silver Star; Bronze Star; Presidential Unit Citation; ASCE Harland Bartholomew Award; AAG Presidential Award (2005)
- Engineering career
- Discipline: Civil engineering, transportation engineering, urban planning
- Practice name: Alan M. Voorhees & Associates (AMV); Autometric, Inc. Atlantic Southeast Airlines (Co-founder)
- Projects: "A General Theory of Traffic Movement" (Mathematical Traffic Gravity Model)
- Significant design: Master plans for Columbia, Maryland

Alan Manners Voorhees (December 17, 1922 – December 18, 2005) was an American transportation engineer and urban planner who designed many large public works in the United States and elsewhere.

== Early life ==
Voorhees was born in Highland Park, New Jersey. During World War II, he left his studies at Rensselaer Polytechnic Institute (RPI) to join the United States Navy as an officer in what was called the "Underwater Demolition Team 11" (UDT-11), a precursor to the U.S. Navy SEALs. He spent much of the war mapping shoreline defenses in the Pacific. After the atomic bombing of Nagasaki, Voorhees' unit was sent in to inspect the city, making him one of the first Americans to see the bomb's aftermath. For his military service he received the Silver Star, the Bronze Star, and the Presidential Unit Citation.

After the war, Voorhees continued his education, graduating from RPI in 1947 and then earning his master's degree in city planning from the Massachusetts Institute of Technology in 1949.

== Transportation planning ==
In 1952, Voorhees came to Washington, D.C. to work for the nonprofit Automobile Safety Foundation. While studying traffic in Baltimore, Voorhees developed a mathematical formula to predict traffic patterns based on land use. This formula has been instrumental in the design of numerous transportation and public works projects around the world. He wrote "A General Theory of Traffic Movement" (1956), which applied the gravity model to trip distribution, which translates trips generated in an area to a matrix that identifies the number of trips from each origin to each destination, which can then be loaded onto the network.

In 1961, he began his own engineering firm (Alan M. Voorhees & Associates) which eventually grew to have branches in ten U.S. cities. He was involved in the design of many subway systems including those in São Paulo, Hong Kong, Caracas, and Washington, D.C. Voorhees is credited with the concept for the Canberra 'Y Plan', linking Australia's capital city with new townships of roads and public transport. Research on this proposal began in 1966 and the final report was presented in 1969.

Voorhees sold his firm in 1967 and became the dean of the College of Architecture, Art and Urban Science at the University of Illinois at Chicago Circle in 1971. The firm went on to be project manager of the Boston Transportation Planning Review. Voorhees invested in Micros Corporation and its electronic cash register in the late 1960s.

Voorhees designed the street grid for land that was reclaimed in lower Manhattan in New York City, connecting new streets to centuries-old already existing roads and to the Brooklyn Bridge. He was also one of the early designers of the United States' Interstate Highway System and helped determine how the highways would cut through or bypass urban areas.

== Later life ==
In 1979, following airline deregulation, Voorhees helped found Atlantic Southeast Airlines, which was later bought by Delta Air Lines.

Voorhees received the first Harland Bartholomew Award of the American Society of Civil Engineers as the engineer who has contributed most to urban planning, and was honored with the establishment of the Alan M. Voorhees Transportation Center at Rutgers University in 1998, and helped found the Voorhees Computing Center at Rensselaer Polytechnic Institute.

He was chairman of the board of Autometric Corp., an aerospace company based in Northern Virginia. Autometric was later sold to Boeing. He was an angel investor of Lizardtech, the software of which was excellent for digital mapping and GIS purposes. Voorhees was an early investor in MICROS Systems, which sold to Oracle Corporation in 2014 for $5.3 billion.

Voorhees was an avid collector of historical maps, amassing an impressive collection of over 300 maps focused on the history of Virginia. He donated this valuable collection, worth millions of dollars, to the Library of Congress, the Library of Virginia, and the Virginia Historical Society.

Voorhees believed government could greatly improve the human condition, and was an early supporter of the Council for Excellence in Government.

Voorhees was heavily involved with the Voorhees College, an Historical Black College in Denmark, SC. Voorhees often provided funding for campus improvement projects as well as scholarship funds for the students.

Voorhees and his family helped start the successful and family-oriented Westmoreland Berry Farm, located in the Northern Neck of Virginia.

In the late 1990s, Voorhees started a project to automate county government services in Richmond County, Virginia. The system he supported involved scanning thousands of land records in the county clerk's office and connecting these with data from the county planning office (topo maps, sewer and water overlays, satellite views, etc.) and tax office. The land records were then sent via the Internet to be archived at the Library of Virginia. He spent over $600,000 on this project.

Voorhees was concerned with environmental protection. He donated over 700 acres (2.8 km^{2}) of land along the Rappahannock river in Virginia to become the Voorhees nature preserve. His interest in government automation was designed to make it easier to identify environmentally sensitive areas and ensure that development took them into account.

Voorhees died in a hotel he owned in Richmond, Virginia from an apparent stroke at the age of 83.
