= Land Use Evolution and Impact Assessment Model =

Predictive computer model

The Land Use Evolution and Impact Assessment Model (or LEAM) is a computer model developed at the University of Illinois at Urbana-Champaign. LEAM is designed to simulate future land use change as a result of alternative policies and development decisions. In recent years, LEAM has been used in combination with transportation and social cost models to better capture the effects land use has on transportation demand and social costs and vice versa.

== History ==
LEAM was first developed in the LEAMlab of the Department of Urban and Regional Planning at the University of Illinois at Urbana-Champaign in the late 1990s with funding from the National Science Foundation. Its popularity with counties and regional agencies in Illinois led to technology licensing from the university and commercialization. In 2003, LEAMgroup was founded by professors Dr. Brian Deal and Dr. Varkki Pallathucheril. Since then, LEAM and its associated planning and decision support tools have been applied all around the U.S. and abroad.

== Approach ==
LEAM was developed to coordinate complex regional planning activities and aid in regionally-based thinking, decision support, and policy establishment.

In LEAM, a region is represented as a 30x30-meter cell grid. A discrete-choice model controls whether land use in each grid cell is transformed from its present state to a new state (residential, commercial, or industrial use) in a particular time step.

Several factors, or drivers, go into determining the likelihood of land use change. Drivers of change include factors associated with each cell such as proximity to cities, employment centers, roads, highways; slope; location within wetlands and floodplains; and characteristics of surrounding cells. Whether or not a cell finally changes states is determined by its probability score and the scores of its neighboring cells as well as a factor of chance.

LEAM results then serve as inputs to impact assessment models that determine the implications of land use change on human, natural, and cultural systems. Some of these models include: transportation demand, air quality, water quality and quantity, runoff pollution, habitat fragmentation, and utility and infrastructure demand and cost.

== See also ==
- UrbanSim
