= Methylated-thiol-coenzyme M methyltransferase =

Identifiers
- EC no.: 2.1.1.251

Databases
- IntEnz: IntEnz view
- BRENDA: BRENDA entry
- ExPASy: NiceZyme view
- KEGG: KEGG entry
- MetaCyc: metabolic pathway
- PRIAM: profile
- PDB structures: RCSB PDB PDBe PDBsum
Search
- PMC: articles
- PubMed: articles
- NCBI: proteins

Methylated-thiol-coenzyme M methyltransferase (EC 2.1.1.251, mtsA (gene)) is an enzyme with systematic name methylated-thiol:coenzyme M methyltransferase. This enzyme catalyses the following chemical reaction:

methanethiol + coenzyme M ⇌ methyl-CoM + hydrogen sulfide (overall reaction)	1

methanethiol + [Co(I) methylated-thiol-specific corrinoid protein] ⇌ [methyl-Co(III) methylated-thiol-specific corrinoid protein] + hydrogen sulfide	1a

[methyl-Co(III) methylated-thiol-specific corrinoid protein] + coenzyme M ⇌ methyl-CoM + [Co(I) methylated-thiol-specific corrinoid protein]	1b

This enzyme involved in methanogenesis from methylated thiols, such as methanethiol, dimethyl sulfide, and 3-S-methylmercaptopropionate.
