= William J. Reilly =

William J. Reilly (March 6, 1899 – November 17, 1970) was an American economist, University Lecturer and writer who is best known for developing Reilly's law of retail gravitation which was named after him. He was the founder and director of the National Institute for Straight Thinking and author of several books in different fields such as marketing, philosophy and economics.

== See also ==
- Reilly's law of retail gravitation
