= Council for Excellence in Government =

The Council for Excellence in Government was a public/private partnership organization initiated in the 1980s designed to improve the effectiveness of federal, state, and local government in the United States. The organization ceased to operate in 2009 and the majority of its staff and programs moved to the Partnership for Public Service.

Originally, the Council was a brainchild of several ex-government officials who had moved on to success in the private sector. They felt that government services and responsiveness to public needs would improve if there were an organization that could bring the private and the public together to meet and exchange ideas.

The Council commissioned public polls, attempted to engage citizens and generate interest in public service, and provided generous awards for innovation in government. Council supporters, called principals, provided advice, assistance, and monetary sponsorship for the Council's activities.

The Council was non-partisan in nature, and had former Presidents Jimmy Carter, George H. W. Bush, and Bill Clinton as honorary chairs of its board. Former President Gerald Ford was also an honorary co-chair until his death.

Virginia philanthropist Alan Voorhees, whose architectural firm designed the Metro system in Washington, D.C., and many other capital cities around the world in the 1960s and 1970s, provided seed money and office space in the early 1980s. Voorhees was always interested in applications of technology to public problems, and was the inventor of the "gravity theory" of traffic flow which was used in transportation planning since the 1950s.
