= Metropolitan Travel Survey Archive =

The U.S. Metropolitan Travel Survey Archive is a project to store, preserve, and make publicly available, via the internet, travel surveys conducted by metropolitan areas, states and localities.

As of 2007, the archive held 58 surveys comprising 2,718,329 trip records, 516,108 person records, 219,097 household records, 173,354 vehicle records, and 528,847 location records. Similar to this U.S. archive, an international archive of travel survey date has been suggested so that this service is expanded into more countries.

The motivation behind the archive is to forestall the loss of electronic files and documentation of surveys, which has befallen previous surveys. These surveys are both costly to conduct, and irreplaceable as it is impossible to reconstruct past records of human travel behavior. The archive was established with funding from the United States Department of Transportation.
