= Autometric =

Satellite imagery company

- Industry: Satellite imagery
- Founded: 1957; 69 years ago
- Defunct: 2000
- Fate: Acquired by Boeing
- Revenue: $80 million (1999)
- Number of employees: 560 (2000)

Autometric Inc. was a company spun out of Paramount Pictures to work with early satellite imagery. Early successes at Autometric included the invention of the Chromatron, which was subsequently sold to Sony and used prior to developing the Trinitron. Autometric created image analysis software for representing imagery of the earth, cataloging, and image analysis and developed early orthophotographic hardware and methodology. Raytheon subsequently acquired the company and transitioned its product focus to military and intelligence projects as the Autometric Operation of Raytheon. In a few years, Autometric split off from Raytheon becoming independent.

Autometric's nominally successful products included Wings Mission Rehearsal, Edge Whole Earth, Spatial Query Server and DataMaster. Wings and Edge were direct predecessors to Google Earth. Bob Cowling, the Director of Product Engineering at Autometric, was the primary developer of Wings. Wings was a mission rehearsal product draping imagery over terrain.

== Edge ==
With advances learned from that experience, Bob built a globe which led to the formation of Edge Whole Earth. Edge was used to develop graphics for National Geographic, CBS Evening News, and the motion picture "Shadow Conspiracy." The success of Edge led to several smaller spin offs, including Edge Development Option. Many of the engineers working on Edge Development Option, went to work for Keyhole, Inc. helping to create what is now Google Earth.

=== Edge Development Option ===
Edge Development Option (EDO) comprises a set of C++ computer libraries produced by Boeing that allows to quickly build 2D and 3D visualization software similar to Google Earth, in order to display satellite imagery and create virtual scenarios for displaying sensor, 3D models, 4D (time-dependent) tracks and for line-of-sight and smart volume analysis. EDO is a toolkit based on EDGE Whole Earth, a software program developed Autometric. While EDGE was initially mainly developed for SGI machines, EDO is mainly Windows-based. EDO retained much of EDGE's functionality but allowed greater flexibility for developers, i.e. the ability to integrate EDO functionality into their own application leveraging on EDO's libraries. Google Earth is the more famous heir to the 3D applications EDGE and EDO.

However, unlike Google Earth, EDO and EDGE were not just 3D or 2D visualisation applications, but they allowed for analysis, e.g. line of sight analysis, and therefore were also used for military applications. EDO provides a continuous display of surveillance and reconnaissance sensors’ positions and fields-of-view, including terrain constraints. The open interface can also deliver real-time data surveillance and reconnaissance feeds using data displayed in a 3-D visualization environment. With precision sensor analysis, satellites and air and ground-based platforms, essential intelligence can be collected in real time. For these reasons, a licensed copy of EDO was also installed in the White House. In addition, outside the United States, the Australian Defence Force uses a licensed copy of this software.

In 2005, EDO was renamed BDO (BattleScape Developer option), and a full-fledged application, named BattleScape, was released together with the toolkit. Mark Turner was the first lead engineer for BDO, followed by Brian Griglak and since 2010 by Valentino Zocca.

== Decline ==
After a series of management blunders and near bankruptcies, Boeing Inc. purchased the company at the end of 2000 as part of the Future Imagery Architecture. Unfortunately, the Future Imagery Architecture became the most spectacular and expensive failure in the 50-year history of American spy satellite projects. Since the F.I.A. debacle, the National Reconnaissance Office has banned Boeing from bidding on new spy satellite contracts. Within ten years, Boeing management shelved all of Automatic's products and removed all references to the company and its products from Boeing websites.
