= John Quincy Stewart =

American astrophysicist

John Quincy Stewart (September 10, 1894, Harrisburg, Pennsylvania – March 19, 1972, Cottonwood, Arizona) was an American astrophysicist.

== Biography ==
Stewart obtained his Ph.D. in physics from Princeton University in 1919. He taught astrophysics at Princeton from 1921 until he retired in 1963.

Stewart was a civilian aeronautical engineer, an Army 1st Lieutenant, and later served as a chief instructor in the Army Engineering School, during World War I. He was later a research engineer in the American Telephone and Telegraph Company. He became interested in social physics in 1946, (first investigated in 1693 by astronomer Edmond Halley), demonstrating the use of physical laws in the area of social sciences, for example, demographic gravitation.

He co-wrote an influential two-volume textbook in 1927 with Raymond Smith Dugan and Henry Norris Russell: Astronomy: A Revision of Young’s Manual of Astronomy (Ginn & Co., Boston, 1926–27, 1938, 1945). This became the standard astronomy textbook for about two decades. There were two volumes: the first was The Solar System and the second was Astrophysics and Stellar Astronomy.
