= Reilly's law of retail gravitation =

In economics, Reilly's law of retail gravitation is a heuristic developed by William J. Reilly in 1931. According to Reilly's "law," customers are willing to travel longer distances to larger retail centers given the higher attraction they present to customers. In Reilly's formulation, the attractiveness of the retail center becomes the analogy for size (mass) in the physical law of gravity.

The law presumes the geography of the area is flat without any rivers, roads or mountains to alter a consumer's decision of where to travel to buy goods. It also assumes consumers are otherwise indifferent between the actual cities. In analogy with Newton's law of gravitation, the point of indifference is the point at which the "attractiveness" of the two retail centres (postulated to be proportional to their size and inversely proportional to the square of the distance to them) is equal:

$$\frac{d_A}{d_B} = \sqrt{\frac{P_A}{P_B}}$$

Where $d_A$ is the distance of the point of indifference from A, $d_B$ is its distance from B, and $P_A/P_B$ is the relative size of the two centres. If the customer is on the line connecting A and B, then if D is the distance between the centres, the point of indifference as measured from A on the line is

$$d= \frac{D}{1+\sqrt{P_B/P_A}}$$

As expected, for centres of the same size, d=D/2, and if A is larger than B, the point of indifference is closer to B. As the size of A becomes very large with respect to B, d tends to D, meaning the customer will always prefer the larger centre unless they're very close to the smaller one.

== Manuscripts that introduced Reilly's law of retail gravitation ==
William J. Reilly wrote Methods for the Study of Retail Relationships in 1929.

The manuscript compiled the following information of that time:

- Census data
- Consumer surveys
- Urban retail data

Two years later, he published The Law of Retail Gravitation, (1931), which goes into more mathematical detail.

== Antecedents ==
In addition to Newton's Law of Gravity in the physical sciences, there were other antecedents to Reilly's "law" of retail gravity. In particular, E.C. Young in 1924 described a formula for migration that was based on the physical law of gravity, and H.C. Carey had included a description of the tendency of humans to "gravitate" together in an 1858 summary of social science theory.

== Applications and Later Works ==
Reilly's law has many variations, and extensions and applications are numerous. Among these include:

- The "Huff" model, which allows for multiple attributes and retail centers;
- Converse's "Breaking Point" formula;
- Batty's generalisation of the breakpoint;

== See also ==
- Demographic gravitation
- Gravity model
- Observations named after people
