= UrbanSim =

Open source urban simulation system

- Release: March 7, 2014; 12 years ago
- Stable release: 3.3 / September 16, 2026; 7 days ago
- Written in: Python
- Operating system: MacOS, Linux, and Windows
- License: New BSD License
- Website: urbansim.com
- Repository: github.com/UDST/urbansim

UrbanSim is an open source urban simulation system designed by Paul Waddell of the University of California, Berkeley and developed with numerous collaborators to support metropolitan land use, transportation, and environmental planning. It has been distributed on the web since 1998, with regular revisions and updates, from www.urbansim.org. Synthicity Inc coordinates the development of UrbanSim and provides professional services to support its application. The development of UrbanSim has been funded by several grants from the National Science Foundation, the U.S. Environmental Protection Agency, the Federal Highway Administration, as well as support from states, metropolitan planning agencies and research councils in Europe and South Africa. Reviews of UrbanSim and comparison to other urban modeling platforms may be found in references.

== Applications ==
The first documented application of UrbanSim was a prototype application to the Eugene-Springfield, Oregon setting. Later applications of the system have been documented in several U.S. cities, including Detroit, Michigan, Salt Lake City, Utah, San Francisco, California, and Seattle, Washington. In Europe, UrbanSim has been applied in Paris, France; Brussels, Belgium; and Zurich, Switzerland with various other applications not yet documented in published papers.

== Architecture ==
The initial implementation of UrbanSim was implemented in Java. The software architecture was modularized and reimplemented in Python beginning in 2005, making extensive use of the Numpy numerical library. The software has been generalized and abstracted from the UrbanSim model system, and is now referred to as the Open Platform for Urban Simulation (OPUS), in order to facilitate a plug-in architecture for models such as activity-based travel, dynamic traffic assignment, emissions, and land cover change. OPUS includes a graphical user interface, and a concise expression language to facilitate access to complex internal operations by non-programmers. Beginning in 2012, UrbanSim was re-implemented using current Scientific Python libraries such as Pandas. UrbanSim Inc. has developed the UrbanSim Cloud Platform that deploys simulations on the cloud for scalability, enabling hundreds or even thousands of simulations to be run simultaneously, and a web browser based User Interface that features a 3D web map view of inputs and outputs from the simulation. UrbanSim models have been pre-built for 400 metropolitan areas within the United States at a census block level of detail. Users anywhere in the world can also build UrbanSim models using zone and parcel templates, by uploading local data and using the cloud resources to auto-specify and calibrate the models using local data. Details are available at www.urbansim.com.

== Design ==
Earlier urban model systems were generally based on deterministic solution algorithms such as Spatial Interaction or Spatial Input-Output, that emphasize repeatability and uniqueness of convergence to an equilibrium, but rest on strong assumptions about behavior, such as agents having perfect information of all the alternative locations in the metropolitan area, transactions being costless, and markets being perfectly competitive. Housing booms and busts, and the 2008 financial crisis, are relatively clear examples of market imperfections that motivate the use of less restrictive assumptions in UrbanSim. Rather than calibrating the model to a cross-sectional equilibrium, or base-year set of conditions, statistical methods have been developed to calibrate uncertainty in UrbanSim arising from its use of Monte Carlo methods and from uncertainty in data and models, against observed data over a longitudinal period, using a method known as Bayesian Melding. In addition to its less strong assumptions about markets, UrbanSim departs from earlier model designs that used high levels of aggregation of geography into large zones, and agents such as households and jobs into large groups assumed to be homogeneous. Instead, UrbanSim adopts a microsimulation approach meaning that it represents individual agents within the simulation. This is an agent-level model system, but unlike most agent-based models, it does not focus exclusively on the interactions of adjacent agents. Households, businesses or jobs, buildings, and land areas represented alternatively by parcels, gridcells, or zones, are used to represent the agents and locations within a metropolitan area. The parcel level modeling applications allow for the first time the representation of accessibility at a walking scale, something that cannot be effectively done at high levels of spatial aggregation.

== Engagement ==
One of the motivations for the UrbanSim project is to not only provide robust predictions of the potential outcomes of different transportation investments and land use policies, but also to facilitate more deliberative civic engagement in what are often contentious debates about transportation infrastructure, or land policies, with uneven distributions of benefits and costs. Initial work on this topic has adopted an approach called Value Sensitive Design. Recent work has also emerged to integrate new forms of visualization, including 3D simulated landscapes.
