= Census Transportation Planning Products Program =

Datasets for transportation planning

The Census Transportation Planning Products Program (CTPP) purchases data tabulations from the US Census Bureau which use data from the American Community Survey (ACS) to inform transportation planning and related efforts. The CTPP is a cooperative program funded by state departments of transportation and technical support for the program is provided by the American Association of State Highway and Transportation Officials (AASHTO).

The main uses of CTPP tabulations are for creating population forecasts, performing environmental justice and social equity analyses, examining household lifecycles and behavior, analyzing the socio-demographics of a population, creating models of vehicle ownership, and validating transportation forecast output. The CTPP tabulations include three geographies: residence-based, workplace-based, and worker flows between home and work. Workers home-to-work flow information is only available from local household behavior surveys or through these special CTPP tabulations.

== History ==
The tabulations that the CTPP procures fall into the category of Journey-to-Work (JTW) which describe the commuting behavior of workers in a given geography. JTW tabulations at standard census bureau geographies were first created in 1960 and were sponsored by the Office of Management and Budget (OMB). The transportation planning community then assumed ownership of the JTW questions when it paid for a set of special tabulations at Traffic Analysis Zones (TAZ) which are the level of geography at which most transportation planning efforts and research are performed.

There were 112 separate buyers of these JTW tabulations in 1970. Most buyers were from metropolitan planning organizations (MPOs) across the country. By 1980 the number of buyers rose to 152. To develop the specifications for the tabulations, an ad-hoc committee of transportation planners was created via the Transportation Research Board (TRB). All the data users shared the cost for the package with help from a special grant from US Department of Transportation (DOT) to cover the cost.

In 1990 a "pooled-fund" process was developed which would allow all states and MPO's to access to the data. The purchase of data from the 1990 decennial census was also funded by a grant from the Bureau of Transportation Statistics (BTS) which helped distribute the data.

For the 2000 tabulations the CTPP Working Group coordinated with AASHTO and paid the Census Bureau for the tabulations. The price for each state involved in the development of the package was based on that state's total population. DOT agencies provided funding for technical support related to use of the data as well as coordination and software.

From 1970 to 2000 the CTPP used data from the decennial census long form. The long-form decennial census was discontinued after the 2000 decennial census and in 2006 much of the content of the long form was replaced with the ACS. As a result, the CTPP now uses the ACS data.

== Training and Outreach ==
The CTPP provides training for users at MPOs and states in four main methods: interactive online learning module, tutorial videos on CTPP web-based software, on-site training program, and tutorial videos on census data. The CTPP provides in-person training sessions which include hands-on work with CTPP data. During the COVID-19 pandemic this hands-on training moved to online-only training.

== Publications and Data ==
Commuting in America (CIA) is a series of reports supported by the CTPP and AASHTO which describe travelers and their commutes to work.

CTPP data are available online and can be accessed using an online database housed on the CTPP website or downloaded via an FTP site. This portal contains the CTPP tabulations from the 1990 decennial census, the 2000 decennial census, the 2006-2010 5-year ACS, and 2012-2016 5-year ACS. The next CTPP tabulations will use the 2016-2020 5-year ACS files and will be released online in 2022.

== Oversight Board ==
The CTPP is run by a Board of 17 voting members: eight state representatives, eight MPO representatives and a Chair as well as ex-officio members from Federal and national agencies, private consulting, and academia. The Ex-officio members include officials from the U.S. DOT agencies, the census bureau, and census data users from academia and consultant firms. The Board is responsible for overseeing the budget and operations of the five-year CTPP program and meets quarterly.
