= National Trip End Model =

The National Trip End Model is a database maintained by the United Kingdom's Department for Transport. The database forecasts future year data for population, employment, housing, car ownership and trip rates, and can thus be used to estimate the future growth in travel to and from homes and workplaces.

The database covers different modes of transport and for different journey purposes such as work, education, shopping and leisure; and can be used to make predictions for different years or different geographical areas within the UK.

The database is maintained by Atkins.

== Range ==
As of 2020, the database includes forecasts up to the year 2051.

== Software ==
The DfT also produce the Trip End Model Presentation Program (TEMPRO) which is a user interface for interrogating the database. As of August 2022 the latest version is 8.0.

== See also ==
- TRICS
