= Newell–Daganzo merge model =

Variables included in Newell–Daganzo merge model represented on diagram of merging traffic branches.

In traffic flow theory, the Newell–Daganzo merge model describes a simple procedure on how to determine the flows exiting two branch roadways and merging to flow through a single roadway. The model is simple in that it does not consider the actual merging process between vehicles as the two branch roadways come together. The only information required to calculate the flows leaving the two branch roadways are the capacities of the two branch roadways and the exiting capacity, the demands into the system, and a value describing how the two input flows interact. This latter input term is called the split priority, or merge ratio, and is defined as the proportion of the two input flows when both are operating in congested conditions.

The history of the merge model has its origins in Gordon Newell's description of the merging process, but Daganzo's cell transmission model lays out a diagram for a highway merge, and describes the application of the theory.

In a simplified model of the merging process, the available capacity exiting the system is defined to be μ, and the capacities of the input branches are μ_{1} and μ_{2}. The demands entering the system are q_{1}^{D} and q_{2}^{D}, which is defined as the demand for the merge passing through μ_{1} and μ_{2}, and thus the maximum demand is the capacity of the inlet branches. The output of the model is the resulting flows that pass through the merge, q_{1} and q_{2}. The assumption is made that the combined capacities of the two inlet branches are less than the capacity of the outlet branch, μ_{1}+ μ_{2} ≤ μ.

== Solution for model ==
There are four possible states for the system to have based on the level of flow occurring in each inlet. Each inlet can be either in free flow or congestion, and thus the system can have both inlets in free flow, one or the other in congestion, or both in congestion. The flow conditions of the inlets are the determining factors in the solution of the model.

Graphical solution to determining the flows q_{1} and q_{2} in the Newell–Daganzo merge model.

The split priority, or merge ratio, is calculated when both inlets are in congestion. At this time, the total flow is μ, with inlet flows of μ_{1}^{*} and μ_{2}^{*}, the minimum capacities of the inlets when both are congested, where μ_{1}^{*} + μ_{2}^{*} = μ. The resultant flows are determined by the interaction between the two inlet flows, influenced by the physical characteristics of the intersection that cause drivers to merge in a defined manner. This merging process can be defined by split priority, p, which is the ratio of μ_{2}^{*} to μ_{1}^{*} (p = μ_{2}^{*} / μ_{1}^{*}). A common split priority rule is the "zipper rule", which describes two flows merging where vehicles merging alternate between the two input streams.

Solving the model can be done graphically, where the four possible states of the system are visible on a plot of the two inlet flows, and boundaries defined by the relationships in the model. The feasible region for q_{1} and q_{2} is bounded by the relationships that the flow in inlet 1 cannot be greater than μ_{1} and similarly for inlet 2, and the relationship of q_{1} + q_{2} = μ. All solutions must be within this region, bounded in red in the figure. A second boundary is the feasible region for demands, the maximum possible values for q_{1}^{D} and q_{2}^{D}, defined to be μ_{1} and μ_{2}, and is bounded by black in the figure. The split priority, p, is plotted from the origin to the line q_{1} + q_{2} = μ.

State A1 is when both inlets are in free flow. All combination of inlet demands in this region (q_{1}^{D}, q_{2}^{D}) produce unchanged inlet flows (q_{1}, q_{2}). State A2 is when inlet 1 is in free flow and inlet 2 is in congestion. Inlet demands in this region produce inlet flows where all of q_{1}^{D} merges while q_{2} = μ − q_{2}^{D} and a queue builds in inlet 2. State A3 is when inlet 1 is in congestion and inlet 2 is in free flow. Inlet demands in this region produce inlet flows where all of q_{2}^{D} merges while q_{1} = μ − q_{1}^{D} and a queue builds in inlet 1. State A4 is when both inlets are in congestion. All inlet demands in this region produce inlet flows equal to where the split priority vector intersects the feasible region of q_{1} and _{2}, at (μ_{1}^{*}, μ_{2}^{*}).

== See also ==
- Traffic flow
