= Traffic zone =

Traffic Zone may refer to:

- Traffic analysis zone, a unit of geography most commonly used in conventional transportation planning models
- Traffic Zone Center for Visual Art, a Minneapolis-based artist cooperative
