= CTM =

CTM is an initialism that may stand for:

== Companies and organizations ==
- Compagnie de Transports au Maroc, a Moroccan public bus transport company
- Companhia de Telecomunicações de Macau, a Macau telecommunications company
- Confederation of Mexican Workers, a confederation of labor unions
- CTM (South Africa), a South African home improvement retail chain

== Technology ==
- Cell Transmission Model, a traffic prediction algorithm
- Chemical transport model, a simulation of atmospheric chemistry and pollution
- Close to Metal, a low-level programming interface
- Concepts, Techniques, and Models of Computer Programming, a 2004 textbook
- Corner transfer matrix, a method in statistical mechanics
- Critical thermal maximum, the temperature above which an organism cannot survive
- Current Transformation Matrix, the transformation matrix currently applying in a graphics pipeline
- Certified Technology Manager, an accreditation by ATMAE - Association of Technology, Management and Applied Engineering.

== Transport ==
- Chatham railway station (Kent), Kent; National Rail station code
- Cheltenham railway station, Melbourne
- Chetumal International Airport, Mexico; IATA code
- Kattankulathur railway station, Chengalpattu, India; Indian Railways station code

== Other ==
- Canadian Tire money, a retail loyalty program
- Chaland de transport de matériel, a French landing craft class
- Chicken tikka masala, a curry dish
- Community Trade Mark, now European Union trade mark, a designation for goods or services
- Computational theory of mind, the view that the human mind is best conceived as a computational system
- Corporate travel management, a generic term for corporate travel agencies
- Cretaceous Thermal Maximum, a period of rapid warming in the Cretaceous period
- CTM Festival, an annual music and visual arts event in Berlin, Germany
