= John Wardrop =

John Wardrop may refer to:

- John Glen Wardrop, English transport analyst
- Sir John Oliver Wardrop (1864–1948), English diplomat
- Jack Wardrop, British swimmer
