= Transportation forecasting =

Estimation of future use of some transport infrastructure

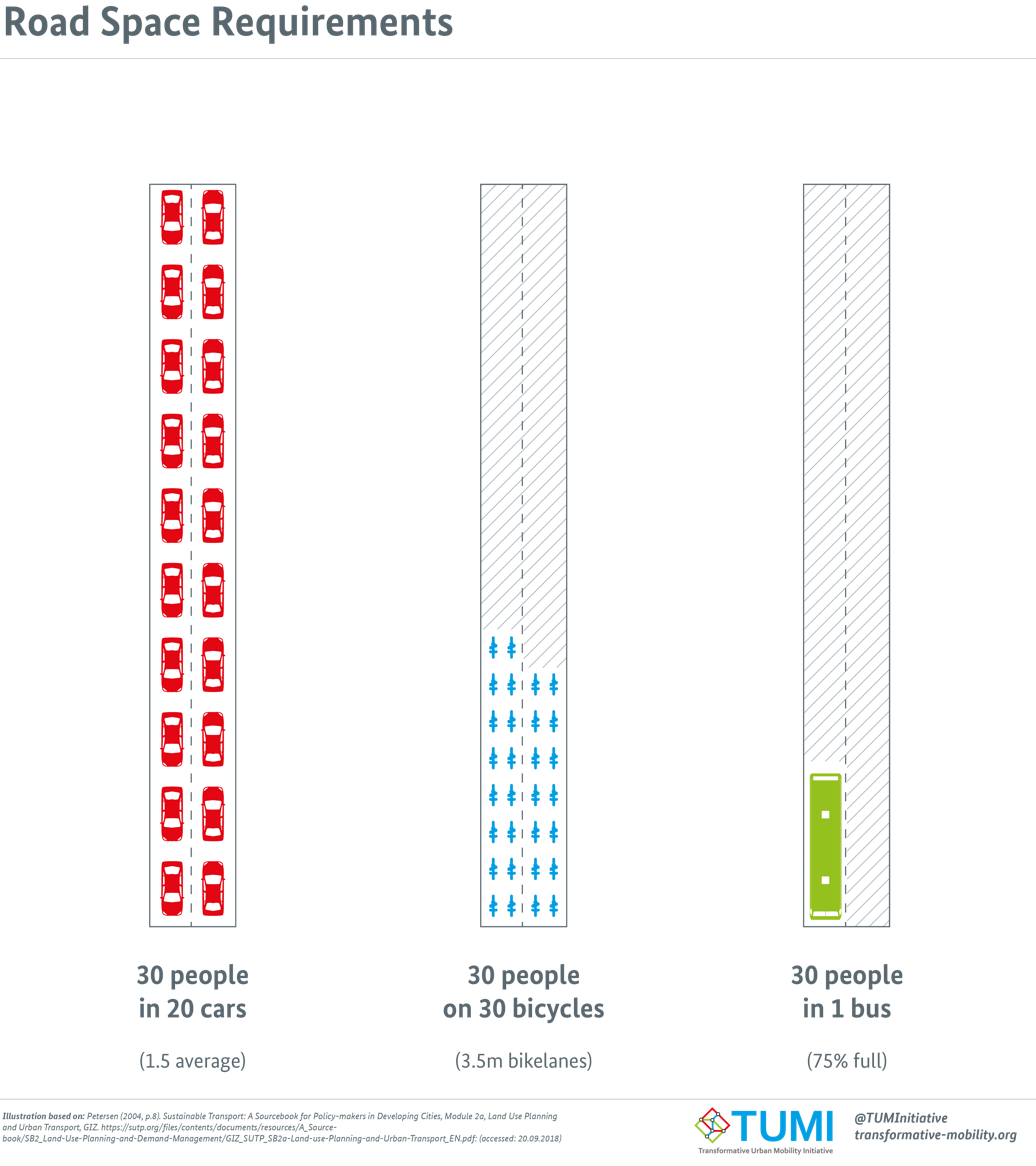

Transportation forecasting is the attempt of estimating the number of vehicles or people that will use a specific transportation facility in the future. For instance, a forecast may estimate the number of vehicles on a planned road or bridge, the ridership on a railway line, the number of passengers visiting an airport, or the number of ships calling on a seaport. Traffic forecasting begins with the collection of data on current traffic. This traffic data is combined with other known data, such as population, employment, trip rates, travel costs, etc., to develop a model of traffic demand for the current situation. Feeding it with predicted data for population, employment, etc. results in estimates of future traffic, typically estimated for each segment of the transportation infrastructure in question, e.g., for each roadway segment or railway station.

Traffic forecasts are used for several key purposes in transportation policy, planning, and engineering: to calculate the capacity of infrastructure, e.g., how many lanes a bridge should have; to estimate the financial and social viability of projects, e.g., using cost–benefit analysis and social impact assessment; and to calculate environmental impacts, e.g., air pollution and noise.

== Four-step models ==
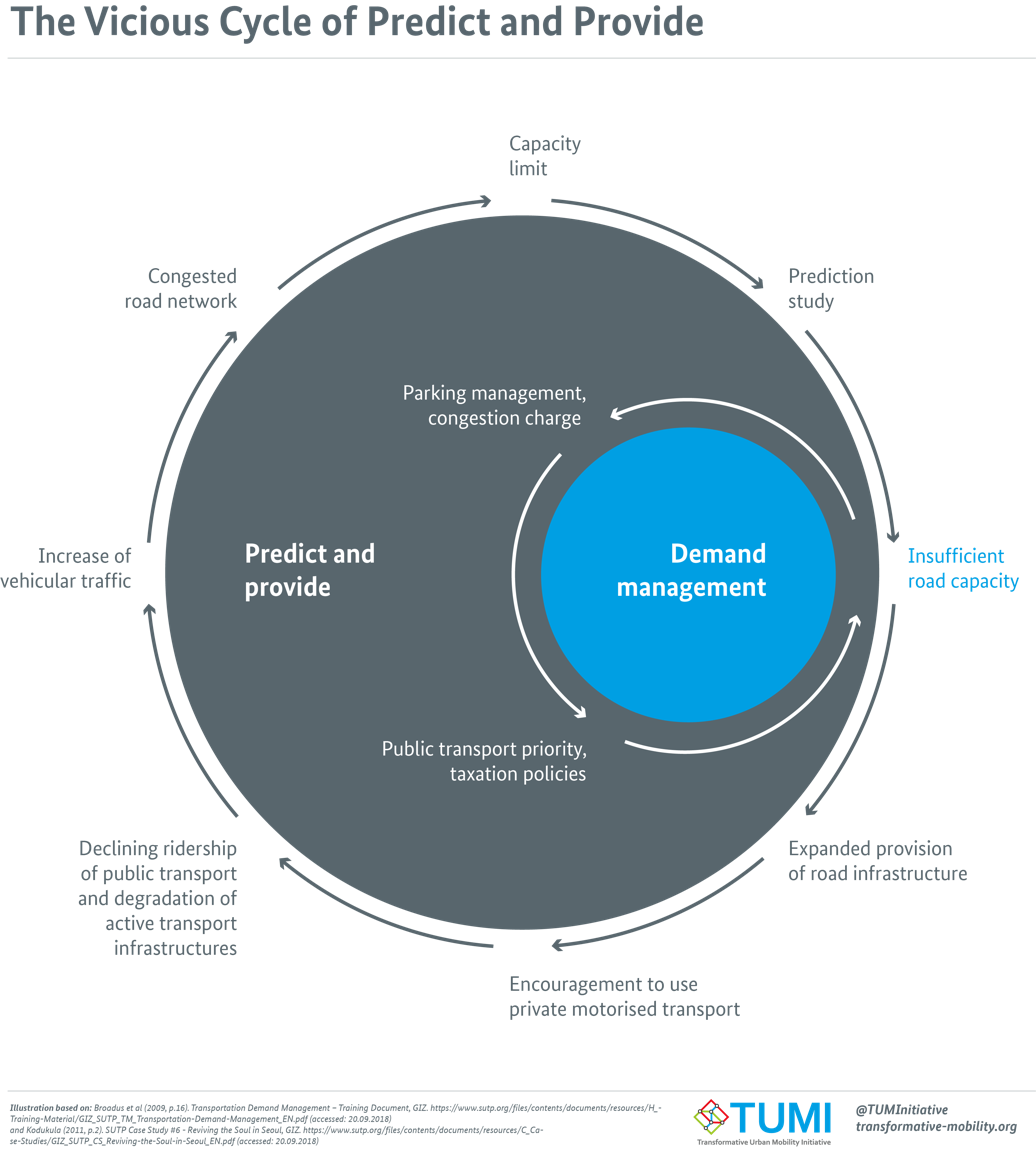
The Vicious Cycle of Predict and Provide

Within the rational planning framework, transportation forecasts have traditionally followed the sequential four-step model or urban transportation planning (UTP) procedure, first implemented on mainframe computers in the 1950s at the Detroit Metropolitan Area Traffic Study and Chicago Area Transportation Study (CATS).

Land-use forecasting starts the process. Typically, forecasts are made for the region as a whole, e.g., of population growth. Such forecasts provide control totals for the local land use analysis. Typically, the region is divided into zones and by trend or regression analysis, the population and employment are determined for each.

The four steps of the classical urban transportation planning system model are:

- Trip generation determines the frequency of origins or destinations of trips in each zone by trip purpose, as a function of land uses and household demographics, and other socio-economic factors.
- Trip distribution matches origins with destinations, often using a gravity model function, equivalent to an entropy maximizing model. Older models include the Fratar or Furness method, a type of iterative proportional fitting.
- Mode choice computes the proportion of trips between each origin and destination that use a particular transportation mode (this modal model may be of the logit form).
- Route assignment allocates trips between an origin and destination by a particular mode to a route. Often (for highway route assignment) Wardrop's principle of user equilibrium is applied (equivalent to a Nash equilibrium), wherein each driver (or group) chooses the shortest (travel time) path, subject to every other driver doing the same. The difficulty is that travel times are a function of demand, while demand is a function of travel time, the so-called bi-level problem. Another approach is to use the Stackelberg competition model, where users ("followers") respond to the actions of a "leader", in this case for example a traffic manager. This leader anticipates on the response of the followers.

After the classical model, there is an evaluation according to an agreed set of decision criteria and parameters. A typical criterion is cost–benefit analysis. Such analysis might be applied after the network assignment model identifies needed capacity: is such capacity worthwhile? In addition to identifying the forecasting and decision steps as additional steps in the process, forecasting and decision-making permeate each step in the UTP process. Planning deals with the future, and it is forecasting dependent.

== Activity-based models ==
Activity-based models are another class of models that predict for individuals where and when specific activities (e.g. work, leisure, shopping, ...) are conducted.

The major premise behind activity-based models is that travel demand is derived from activities that people need or wish to perform, with travel decisions forming part of the scheduling decisions. Travel is then seen as just one of the attributes of a system. The travel model is therefore set within the context of an agenda, as a component of an activity scheduling decision.

Activity-based models offer other possibilities than four-step models, e.g. to model environmental issues such as emissions and exposure to air pollution. Although their obvious advantages for environmental purposes were recognized by Shiftan almost a decade ago, applications to exposure models remain scarce. Activity-based models have recently been used to predict emissions and air quality. They can also provide a better total estimate of exposure while also enabling the disaggregation of individual exposure over activities. They can therefore be used to reduce exposure misclassification and establish relationships between health impacts and air quality more precisely. Policy makers can use activity-based models to devise strategies that reduce exposure by changing time activity patterns or that target specific groups in the population.

== Integrated Transport - Land Use Models ==
These models are intended to forecast the effect of changes in the transport network and operations over the future location of activities, and then forecast the effect of these new locations over the transport demand.

== Per-driver models ==
As data science and big data technologies become available to transport modelling, research is moving towards modelling and predicting behaviours of individual drivers in whole cities at the individual level. This will involve understanding individual drivers' origins and destinations as well as their utility functions. This may be done by fusing per-driver data collected on road networks, such as by ANPR cameras, with other data on individuals, such as data from their social network profiles, store card purchase data, and search engine history. This will lead to more accurate predictions, enhanced ability to control traffic for customized prioritization of particular drivers, but also to ethical concerns as local and national governments use more data about identifiable individuals. While the integration of such partially personal data is tempting, there are considerable privacy concerns over the possibilities, related to the criticisms of mass surveillance.

== Precursor steps ==
Although not identified as steps in the UTP process, a lot of data gathering is involved in the UTP analysis process. Census and land use data are obtained, along with home interview surveys and journey surveys. Home interview surveys, land use data, and special trip attraction surveys provide the information on which the UTP analysis tools are exercised.

Data collection, management, and processing; model estimation; and use of models to yield plans are much used techniques in the UTP process. In the early days, in the USA, census data was augmented that with data collection methods that had been developed by the Bureau of Public Roads (a predecessor of the Federal Highway Administration): traffic counting procedures, cordon "where are you coming from and where are you going" counts, and home interview techniques. Protocols for coding networks and the notion of analysis or traffic zones emerged at the CATS.

Model estimation used existing techniques, and plans were developed using whatever models had been developed in a study. The main difference between now and then is the development of some analytic resources specific to transportation planning, in addition to the BPR data acquisition techniques used in the early days.

== Critique ==
The sequential and aggregate nature of transportation forecasting has come under much criticism. While improvements have been made, in particular giving an activity-base to travel demand, much remains to be done. In the 1990s, most federal investment in model research went to the Transims project at Los Alamos National Laboratory, developed by physicists. While the use of supercomputers and the detailed simulations may be an improvement on practice, they have yet to be shown to be better (more accurate) than conventional models. A commercial version was spun off to IBM, and an open source version is also being actively maintained as TRANSIMS Open-Source.

A 2009 Government Accountability Office report noted that federal review of transportation modeling focused more on process requirements (for example, did the public have adequate opportunity to comment?) than on transportation outcomes (such as reducing travel times, or keeping pollutant or greenhouse gas emissions within national standards).

One of the major oversights in the use of transportation models in practice is the absence of any feedback from transportation models on land use. Highways and transit investments not only respond to land use, they shape it as well.

== See also ==
- Air traffic control
- Journal of Transport and Land Use
- Optimism bias
- Reference class forecasting
- Road traffic control
- Traffic bottleneck
- TRANUS
