= Vertical queue =

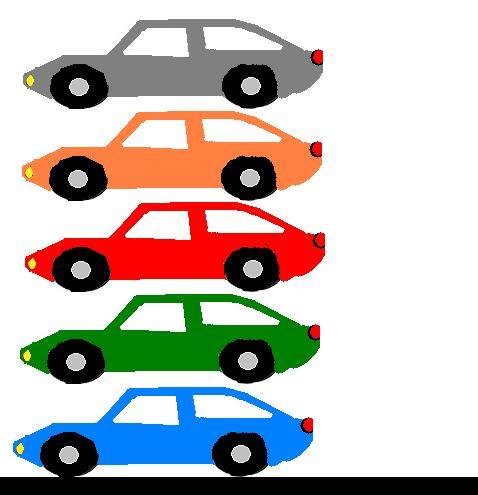
Vertical queue of vehicles

The concept of a vertical queue is often used in traffic flow studies as a common assumption to simplify analysis problems.

Its use enables many calculations to be simplified, allowing researchers to get to the core of their problem, while ignoring the effects of queue buildup on a roadway. Vertical queues can also be used in traffic signal analysis, with vertical queues occurring at the location of the stop bar.

== Concept usage ==
The vertical queue assumption presumes that vehicles on a roadway do not back up over the length of the roadway, which would be considered a horizontal queue, but rather stack up upon one another at the point where congestion begins or at the stop line of a traffic signal. The vertical queue is unitless, and is simply representative of the number of vehicles which are delayed at a given point in a system. This is clearly not possible in real life, but the assumption allows vehicles in an analysis to drive at the free flow speed until reaching the point of congestion. A vehicle does not have to travel at less than the free flow speed due to a road being congested because of a horizontal queue. This simplification is widely accepted by traffic flow theorists.

Vehicles enter the vertical queue at the top of the stack and depart from the bottom. The first vehicle to arrive at the point of congestion would thus be at the bottom of the vertical queue. Vehicles incur no delay traveling to the point of congestion, and travel to the point at which the vertical queue occurs without hindrance. The vehicles only incur delay while in congestion or at the stop line. The time vehicles spend within the vertical queue is the difference between the undelayed travel time to the point of congestion and the actual travel time. It is equal to the delay incurred before the point of congestion.
