= Truck lane restriction =

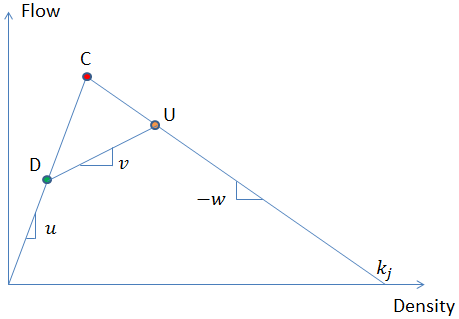
Moving Bottleneck in Triangular Fundamental Diagram.

Truck lane restriction within transportation traffic engineering, is a factor impacting freeway truck lanes and traffic congestion. In traffic flow theory, intuitively, slow vehicles (e.g. trucks) will cause queues behind them, but how it relates to the kinematic wave theory was not revealed until Newell. Leclercq et al did a complete review of Newell's theory. In addition to the simulation models developed by Laval and Daganzo on the basis of numerical solution methods for Newell's theory to capture the impacts of slow vehicle, Laval also mathematically derived the analytical capacity formulas for bottlenecks caused by single-type of trucks for multi-lane freeway segments.

== Analytical Solution of the Single-type Truck Problem ==
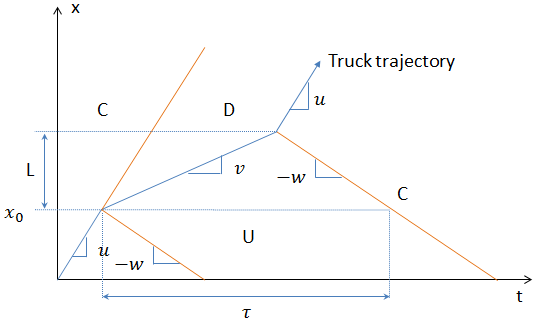
Truck Trajectory and Induced Traffic States

Laval's solution could be summarized as follows: Assuming a one-lane freeway segment obeying the triangular fundamental diagram defined in the figure to the right with free-flow speed u, wave velocity w and jam density k_{j}. Only one truck type is considered. In this scenario, the normalized capacity I of the freeway segment is given as：

$I=\frac{1}{rHC}$

where r is the time-mean proportion of trucks in the traffic stream,C = uwnk_{j}/(w+u)is the capacity of the freeway lane without trucks and H is the expected value of headway between two consecutive trucks at the location where trucks begin to slow down

It can be shown that, by approximating truck arrivals with Poisson processes, the probability density function (PDF) of H is the equation below, in which τ is defined as the clearance time of the queue induced by the slow-moving truck, λ_{0}=rC, λ_{1}=rU and τ=L(w+v)/wv. Note that λ_{0} and λ_{1} refer to the mean truck arrival rate at traffic state C or U, respectively. In particular, traffic state D, which corresponds to the downstream of the moving bottleneck, is assumed to be equal to the capacity of the unblocked lanes.

$$f_H(h)=\begin{cases}\lambda_1 e^{-h\lambda_1}, & h\le\tau \\ e^{\tau(\lambda_0-\lambda_1)}\lambda_0 e^{-h\lambda_0}, & h>\tau\end{cases}$$

According to Newell's moving bottleneck theory, we have:

$U=D+(\frac{wvkj}{w+v})$

Given all the above information, we can conclude that the average truck headway H is H=(1-e^{−λ_{1}τ})/(λ_{1})+(e^{−λ_{1}τ})/(λ_{0})

And the above equation gives us all the necessary information to solve the normalized capacity I.
