= TRICS =

- The TRICS interface
- Developer: TRICS Consortium
- Stable release: 8.26.2 / November 2025
- Type: Traffic Software
- License: Software license agreement
- Website: www.trics.org

TRICS (Trip Rate Information Computer System) is a database of trip rates for developments used in the United Kingdom for transport planning purposes, specifically to quantify the trip generation of new developments.

The TRICS Consortium describes TRICS as follows:

TRICS is the system that challenges and validates assumptions about the transport impacts of new developments. It is the national system of trip generation analysis, a large database of inbound & outbound transport surveys covering a wide variety of development types.

== Release history ==
The database was established in 1989 by six county councils in South East England (Dorset, East Sussex, Hampshire, Kent, Surrey and West Sussex). It is now maintained by TRICS Consortium Ltd, based in Barnet, London.

TRICS 8 launched in June 2025, overhauling the system, giving it a more modern, simplified look.

== Developments ==
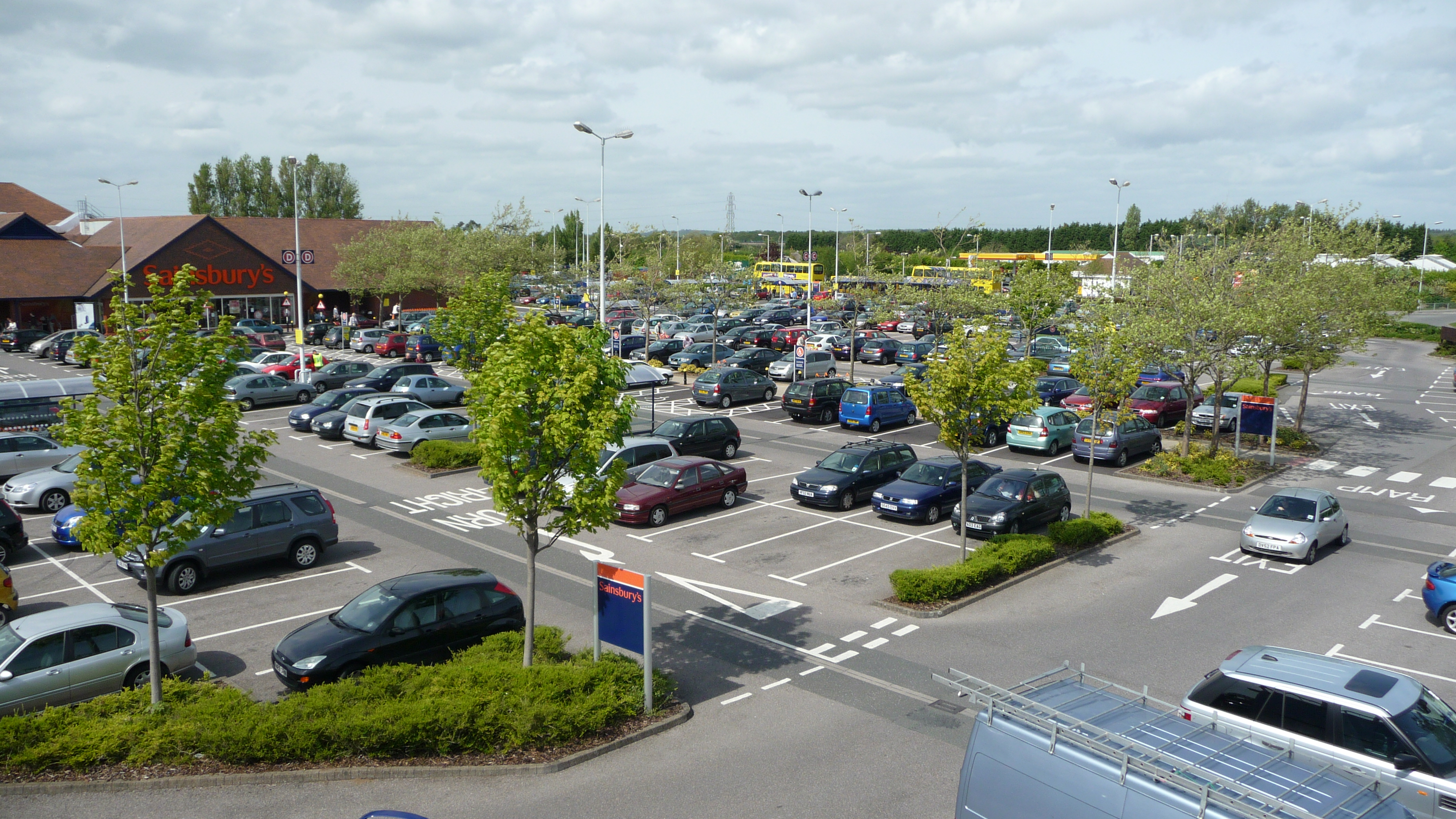
Developments such as supermarkets generate multi-modal trips. TRICS contains trip generation rates for different categories of development.

TRICS includes the following development categories:

1. Retail
2. Employment
3. Residential
4. Educational
5. Health
6. Hotel, Food, and Drink
7. Leisure
8. Marinas
9. Golf
10. Tourist Attractions
11. [none]*
12. Civic Amenity Sites
13. Vehicle Refueling Stations
14. Car Showrooms
15. Vehicle Services
16. Mixed
17. New Communities

*The programme has 16 categories, numbered 1 to 17, with 11 excluded.

== SAM for Travel Plans ==
TRICS have also developed SAM (Standard Assessment Methodology), a system to measure the effectiveness of travel plans.
