= Kinematic wave =

Mathematical tool for wave analysis

In gravity and pressure driven fluid dynamical and geophysical mass flows such as ocean waves, avalanches, debris flows, mud flows, flash floods, etc., kinematic waves are important mathematical tools to understand the basic features of the associated wave phenomena. These waves are also applied to model the motion of highway traffic flows.

In these flows, mass and momentum equations can be combined to yield a kinematic wave equation. Depending on the flow configurations, the kinematic wave can be linear or non-linear, which depends on whether the wave phase speed is a constant or a variable. A kinematic wave can be described by a simple partial differential equation with a single unknown field variable (e.g., the flow or wave height, $h$) in terms of the two independent variables, namely the time ($t$) and the space ($x$) with some parameters (coefficients) containing information about the physics and geometry of the flow. In general, the wave can be advecting and diffusing. However, in simple situations, the kinematic wave is mainly advecting.

== Kinematic wave for debris flow ==
Non-linear kinematic wave for debris flow can be written as follows with complex non-linear coefficients:
$$\frac{\partial h}{\partial t} + C \frac{\partial h}{\partial x} = D \frac{\partial^2 h}{\partial x^2},$$
where $h$ is the debris flow height, $t$ is the time, $x$ is the downstream channel position, $C$ is the pressure gradient and the depth dependent nonlinear variable wave speed, and $D$ is a flow height and pressure gradient dependent variable diffusion term. This equation can also be written in the conservative form:

$$\frac{\partial h}{\partial t} + \frac{\partial F}{\partial x} = 0,$$

where $F$ is the generalized flux that depends on several physical and geometrical parameters of the flow, flow height and the hydraulic pressure gradient. For $F=h^2/2$, this equation reduces to the Burgers' equation.
