= Traffic analysis zone =

Geographic unit used in travel demand modeling

A traffic analysis zone or transportation analysis zone (TAZ) is the unit of geography most commonly used in conventional transportation planning models. The size of a zone varies, but for a typical metropolitan planning software, a zone of under 3,000 people is common. The spatial extent of zones typically varies in models, ranging from very large areas in the exurb to as small as city blocks or buildings in central business districts. There is no technical reason zones cannot be as small as single buildings, however additional zones add to the computational burden.

Zones are constructed by census block information. Typically these blocks are used in transportation models by providing socio-economic data. States differ in the socio-economic data that they attribute to the zones. Most often the critical information is the number of automobiles per household, household income, and employment within these zones. This information helps to further the understanding of trips that are produced and attracted within the zone. Again these zones can change or be altered as mentioned in the first paragraph. This is done typically to eliminate unneeded areas to limit the computational burden.
