= John Glen Wardrop =

Major theorist of traffic flow equilibrium

John Glen Wardrop (1922–1989), born in Warwick, England, was an English mathematician and transport analyst who developed what became known as Wardrop's first and second principles of equilibrium in the field of traffic assignment.

He studied at Downing College, Cambridge, and worked in Operational Research at British Bomber Command during the Second World War. He then helped to set up, and later headed, the Traffic Section of the Road Research Laboratory near Slough – part of the Directorate of Scientific and Industrial Research within the UK Civil Service – where he published his work on equilibrium. He subsequently followed Dr Reuben Smeed to University College London, becoming Reader Emeritus in Traffic Studies.

He is particularly known for the invention of the Wardrop equilibrium principles - two principles that define the state of equilibrium in transportation networks that are subject to congestion.

== See also ==
- Congestion game
