= Dov Levine =

American physicist

Dov I. Levine (Hebrew: דב לוין; born July 19, 1958) is an American-Israeli physicist, known for his research on quasicrystals, soft condensed matter physics (including granular materials, emulsions, and foams), and statistical mechanics out of equilibrium.

== Education and career ==
The son of a professor of physical chemistry, Dov Levine grew up in New York. He graduated in 1979 with a B.S. from Stony Brook University and in 1986 with a Ph.D. in physics from the University of Pennsylvania. His Ph.D. thesis Quasicrystals: A New Class of Ordered Structure was supervised by Paul Steinhardt.

In 1981, Levine and Steinhardt began developing their theory of a hypothetical new form of matter with icosahedral symmetry (or other forbidden symmetries) that violated the century-old laws of crystallography. The idea, motivated by their study of Penrose tilings, was to consider atomic arrangements that are quasiperiodic rather than periodic. They introduced the term quasicrystals, short for quasiperiodic crystal, to describe the idea. Independently, in April 1982, while studying an aluminum-manganese alloy, A6Mn, Dan Shechtman made a scientific observation, published in 1984, of "a metallic solid which diffracts electrons like a single crystal but has a point group symmetry (icosahedral) that is inconsistent with lattice translations." When Levine and Steinhardt were shown a preprint, they recognized the diffraction pattern as matching their prediction for an icosahedral quasicrystal and, hence, published their theory and proposed that explanation.

According to Steinhardt:

Quasicrystals are quasiperiodic structures with an arrangement described by a sum of two or more periodic functions whose periods have a ratio equal to an irrational number; so, they are precisely described like a crystal but in a non-repeating pattern, like a glass.

Levine was from 1986 to 1988 a postdoctoral member of UCSB's ITP (now known as KIPT) and from 1988 to 1989 a visiting scientist at the Weizmann Institute. He was from 1988 to 1991 an assistant professor at the University of Florida. In 1990 he joined the physics department of the Technion, where he is now a professor of physics. For the academic year 1997–1998 he was a visiting member of UCSB's ITP.

In 2020 he published, with Shankar Ghosh and five other colleagues, research on the development of rechargeable N95 masks.

== Awards and honors ==
- National Science Foundation Presidential Young Investigator Award
- Alon Fellowship at Tel Aviv University
- Minoru and Ethel Tsutsui Distinguished Graduate Research Award from the New York Academy of Sciences.
- With Paul Steinhardt and Alan Mackay, the Oliver E. Buckley Condensed Matter Prize
- 2021 Fellow of the American Physical Society.

== Selected publications ==
- Levine, Dov; Steinhardt, Paul J. (1986). "Quasicrystals. I. Definition and structure". Physical Review B. 34 (2): 596–616. Bibcode:1986PhRvB..34..596L. doi:10.1103/PhysRevB.34.596. PMID 9939667. (over 850 citations)
- Chaikin, P.M.; Behrooz, A.; Itzler, M.A.; Wilks, C.; Whitehead, B.; Grest, G.; Levine, D. (1988). "Studies of quasicrystalline superconducting networks". Physica B: Condensed Matter. 152 (1–2): 113–124. Bibcode:1988PhyB..152..113C. doi:10.1016/0921-4526(88)90076-2.
- Biham, Ofer; Middleton, A. Alan; Levine, Dov (1992). "Self-organization and a dynamical transition in traffic-flow models". Physical Review A. 46 (10): R6124 – R6127. arXiv:cond-mat/9206001. Bibcode:1992PhRvA..46.6124B. doi:10.1103/PhysRevA.46.R6124. PMID 9907993. S2CID 14543020. (over 1050 citations)
- Zik, O.; Levine, Dov; Lipson, S. G.; Shtrikman, S.; Stavans, J. (1994). "Rotationally Induced Segregation of Granular Materials". Physical Review Letters. 73 (5): 644–647. Bibcode:1994PhRvL..73..644Z. doi:10.1103/PhysRevLett.73.644. PMID 10057501. (over 350 citations)
- Lacasse, Martin-D.; Grest, Gary S.; Levine, Dov; Mason, T. G.; Weitz, D. A. (1996). "Model for the Elasticity of Compressed Emulsions". Physical Review Letters. 76 (18): 3448–3451. arXiv:mtrl-th/9603006. Bibcode:1996PhRvL..76.3448L. doi:10.1103/PhysRevLett.76.3448. PMID 10060969. S2CID 15288740.
- Lau, A. W. C.; Levine, Dov; Pincus, P. (2000). "Novel Electrostatic Attraction from Plasmon Fluctuations". Physical Review Letters. 84 (18): 4116–4119. arXiv:cond-mat/0006266. Bibcode:2000PhRvL..84.4116L. doi:10.1103/PhysRevLett.84.4116. PMID 10990624. S2CID 43080552.
- Silbert, Leonardo E.; Ertaş, Deniz; Grest, Gary S.; Halsey, Thomas C.; Levine, Dov; Plimpton, Steven J. (2001). "Granular flow down an inclined plane: Bagnold scaling and rheology". Physical Review E. 64 (5) 051302. arXiv:cond-mat/0105071. Bibcode:2001PhRvE..64e1302S. doi:10.1103/PhysRevE.64.051302. PMID 11735913. S2CID 32482459. (over 1050 citations)
- Bouchaud, J.-P.; Claudin, P.; Levine, D.; Otto, M. (2001). "Force chain splitting in granular materials: A mechanism for large-scale pseudo-elastic behaviour". The European Physical Journal E. 4 (4): 451–457. arXiv:cond-mat/0011213. Bibcode:2001EPJE....4..451B. doi:10.1007/s101890170100. S2CID 17109407.
- Ertaş, D.; Grest, G. S.; Halsey, T. C.; Levine, D.; Silbert, L. E. (2001). "Gravity-driven dense granular flows". Europhysics Letters. 56 (2): 214–220. arXiv:cond-mat/0005051. Bibcode:2001EL.....56..214E. doi:10.1209/epl/i2001-00508-7. S2CID 113715251.
- Silbert, Leonardo E.; Grest, Gary S.; Plimpton, Steven J.; Levine, Dov (2002). "Boundary effects and self-organization in dense granular flows". Physics of Fluids. 14 (8): 2637–2646. Bibcode:2002PhFl...14.2637S. doi:10.1063/1.1487379.
- Silbert, Leonardo E.; Ertaş, Deniz; Grest, Gary S.; Halsey, Thomas C.; Levine, Dov (2002). "Geometry of frictionless and frictional sphere packings". Physical Review E. 65 (3) 031304. arXiv:cond-mat/0111140. Bibcode:2002PhRvE..65c1304S. doi:10.1103/PhysRevE.65.031304. PMID 11909043. S2CID 43696767.
- Silbert, Leonardo E.; Ertaş, Deniz; Grest, Gary S.; Halsey, Thomas C.; Levine, Dov (2002). "Analogies between granular jamming and the liquid-glass transition". Physical Review E. 65 (5) 051307. Bibcode:2002PhRvE..65e1307S. doi:10.1103/PhysRevE.65.051307. PMID 12059551.
- Kurchan, Jorge; Levine, Dov (2011). "Order in glassy systems". Journal of Physics A: Mathematical and Theoretical. 44 (3) 035001. arXiv:1008.4068. Bibcode:2011JPhA...44c5001K. doi:10.1088/1751-8113/44/3/035001. S2CID 118335283.
- Sausset, François; Levine, Dov (2011). "Characterizing Order in Amorphous Systems". Physical Review Letters. 107 (4) 045501. arXiv:1103.2977. Bibcode:2011PhRvL.107d5501S. doi:10.1103/PhysRevLett.107.045501. PMID 21867017. S2CID 43395005.
- Hexner, Daniel; Levine, Dov (2015). "Hyperuniformity of Critical Absorbing States". Physical Review Letters. 114 (11) 110602. arXiv:1407.0146. Bibcode:2015PhRvL.114k0602H. doi:10.1103/PhysRevLett.114.110602. PMID 25839254. S2CID 23951607.
- Cavagna, Andrea; Giardina, Irene; Grigera, Tomas S.; Jelic, Asja; Levine, Dov; Ramaswamy, Sriram; Viale, Massimiliano (2015). "Silent Flocks: Constraints on Signal Propagation Across Biological Groups". Physical Review Letters. 114 (21) 218101. arXiv:1410.2868. Bibcode:2015PhRvL.114u8101C. doi:10.1103/PhysRevLett.114.218101. PMID 26066459. S2CID 43531328.
- Hexner, Daniel; Levine, Dov (2017). "Noise, Diffusion, and Hyperuniformity". Physical Review Letters. 118 (2) 020601. arXiv:1611.02386. Bibcode:2017PhRvL.118b0601H. doi:10.1103/PhysRevLett.118.020601. PMID 28128632. S2CID 23296146.
- Martiniani, Stefano; Chaikin, Paul M.; Levine, Dov (2019). "Quantifying Hidden Order out of Equilibrium". Physical Review X. 9 (1) 011031. arXiv:1708.04993. Bibcode:2019PhRvX...9a1031M. doi:10.1103/PhysRevX.9.011031. S2CID 54647207.
- Martiniani, Stefano; Lemberg, Yuval; Chaikin, Paul M.; Levine, Dov (2020). "Correlation Lengths in the Language of Computable Information". Physical Review Letters. 125 (17) 170601. arXiv:2004.03502. Bibcode:2020PhRvL.125q0601M. doi:10.1103/PhysRevLett.125.170601. PMID 33156672. S2CID 215238667. (See Rudin–Shapiro sequence.)
- Wilken, Sam; Guerra, Rodrigo E.; Levine, Dov; Chaikin, Paul M. (2021). "Random Close Packing as a Dynamical Phase Transition". Physical Review Letters. 127 (3) 038002. Bibcode:2021PhRvL.127c8002W. doi:10.1103/PhysRevLett.127.038002. OSTI 1850634. PMID 34328779. S2CID 236531841.

== See also ==
- Biham–Middleton–Levine traffic model
