= TransModeler =

Traffic simulation product

- Developer: Caliper Corporation
- Stable release: 6.1 / January 2022
- Operating system: Windows XP, Windows Vista, Windows 7, Windows 10
- Type: Traffic Simulation, GIS, Transportation, Mapping Software
- Website: Caliper TransModeler Home

TransModeler is a based traffic simulation platform for doing wide-area traffic planning, traffic management, and emergency evacuation studies that is developed by Caliper Corporation. It can animate the behavior of multi-modal traffic systems to show the flow of vehicles, the operation of traffic signals, and the overall performance of the transportation network.

== About TransModeler ==
TransModeler is a traffic simulation package applicable to a wide array of traffic planning and modeling tasks. TransModeler can simulate many kinds of road networks, including freeways and downtown areas, and can analyze wide-area multimodal networks. It can be used to model and visualize the behavior of traffic systems in a 2-dimensional or 3-dimensional GIS environment to illustrate and evaluate traffic flow dynamics, traffic signal and ITS operations, connected and automated vehicles (CAVs), and overall network performance.

Like other Caliper Corporation products, TransModeler is a native GIS environment. TransModeler integrates with TransCAD, the travel demand forecasting software. TransModeler includes a proprietary BASIC-like programming language (Caliper Script) within a development interface (GISDK) that allows automation of the TransModeler environment. TransModeler includes a relational database and a matrix engine for native matrix operations.

TransModeler simulates public transportation as well as bicycle, car, and truck traffic. Transit route system travel demand can be specified as either schedule or headway based. Pedestrian crossing demand can also be simulated.

TransModeler is inherently a trip-based microscopic simulation package. Demand can also be simulated using turning movement volumes. The trip-based routing handles a wide variety of intelligent transportation system (ITS) features such as managed lanes (such as HOV and HOT lanes), electronic toll collection, route guidance, and traffic detection and surveillance. Simulation-based dynamic traffic assignment (DTA) can be used to inform vehicle's route choices. Calibration methods like Origin-Destination Matrix Estimation (ODME) are also available.

TransModeler's road editor natively supports two-way links and roads, which enables automatic handling for two-way left-turn lanes (TWLTL) and automatic handling of overtaking/passing on two-lane highways. Vehicle conflict points and yield points are automatically calculated inside of intersections. Road networks can be imported from Synchro, CORSIM, and TransCAD line layers. TransModeler is integrated with the Highway Capacity Software (HCS) in that it can be used to simulate Urban Streets, Freeway Facilities and Stop-Controlled Intersection (TWSC/ASWC) files created in HCS.

TransModeler includes various tools for managing a simulation project and the associated scenarios. Project databases, traffic signal timing plans, and other input data can be shared between multiple projects and scenarios.

== TransModeler Projects ==
TransModeler is used for projects throughout the world.

=== Wide Area, High Fidelity Traffic Simulation for MAG ===
For the Maricopa Association of Governments, Caliper developed the largest high-fidelity microsimulation model ever attempted. Using TransModeler, vehicle traffic was simulated within a 500 square mile area of Phoenix using a microscopic model with a .1 second time step. The network includes more than 1800 traffic signals which were simulated at the same time. The network is represented at the lane level with accurate intersection placement and geography. An equilibrium dynamic traffic assignment (DTA) was performed using the microscopic loading.

=== Lake County Area Microsimulation Model ===
TransModeler was used to calibrate a model spanning most of Lake County, CA. The focus of the model was the management of traffic demand between routes north and south of Clear Lake. The corridor is more than 50 miles in length, is made up of State Routes 20, 29, and 53, and includes most local roads in the towns through which the routes pass. After calibrating and validating the model, alternative strategies for traffic calming and access management in the towns were considered with a view toward attracting traffic to the route south of the Lake, which impacts local communities to a much lesser degree.

=== Whatcom County Area-wide Micro-simulation Model ===
Caliper developed a microscopic traffic simulation model of Whatcom County, WA. The existing micro-simulation database in TransModeler was expanded to the scope of the regional travel demand model, with a detailed representation of highway geography and traffic signal control in the region. Time-varying origin-destination (OD) demand was estimated to match available field data, and a Dynamic Traffic Assignment (DTA) based on TransModeler’s microscopic traffic simulation was used to estimate a consistent set of congested travel times. The high prevalence of truck traffic and the crossings along the Canada–US border caused further challenges to accurately modeling dynamic trip patterns, route selection behavior and vehicle interactions. The completed large-scale model was used to assist planning and traffic operations staff with conducting scenario analyses and evaluating traffic management strategies for informed decision-making.

=== Capital Beltway High-occupancy Toll (HOT) Lanes ===
Caliper Corporation developed a TransModeler traffic simulation of the High-occupancy toll lanes (HOT) lanes on the Capital Beltway (I-495) in Virginia with Transurban, a leading toll road owner and operator in Australia and North America. The Capital Beltway HOT Lanes project is a nearly two billion dollar public-private partnership that is intended to be an innovative solution to traffic congestion through dynamic, open-road tolling. Sensors will monitor traffic levels continuously, and a tolling algorithm designed to maintain a target level of service in the HOT lanes will adjust the price dynamically. Drivers who choose to use the HOT lanes will pay a toll conveyed to them via dynamic message signs. Carpools with three or more persons, buses, and emergency vehicles will be able to use the HOT lanes without charge.

=== Integrated Corridor Management Program – Analysis, Modeling and Simulation (AMS) for the I-270 Corridor in Montgomery County, Maryland (Phase I) ===
Caliper Corporation developed a pilot TransModeler micro-simulation model for the I-270 corridor in Montgomery County, MD. This work was conducted for the University of Maryland’s Center for Advanced Transportation Technology (CATT) and Maryland’s State Highway Administration (SHA). The objective of this project was to demonstrate the feasibility and benefits of TransModeler in supporting large-scale corridor analyses such as the Integrated Corridor Management (ICM) initiative by the US DOT. The ICM initiative aims to demonstrate the use of Intelligent Transportation Systems (ITS) to plan and manage congested traffic corridors by assisting decision-makers in identifying gaps, evaluating strategies, and investing in the best combination of strategies that would minimize congestion and improve safety. The I-270 corridor in Maryland is one of eight test sites selected by the US DOT.

=== Micro-simulation of Greater Eureka Area, CA ===
Caliper has developed a micro-simulation model of the Greater Eureka Area (GEA) in Northern California for the California Department of Transportation (Caltrans) and Humboldt County. The simulation in TransModeler is integrated with the GEA travel model in TransCAD and includes a number of base year and future scenarios. The simulation model and the GEA travel model provide a comprehensive travel demand and traffic simulation platform with which Caltrans, county, and city staff evaluate projects now and in the future.

=== State Route 91 Corridor System Management Plan ===
CLR Analytics developed, calibrated, and validated a traffic microsimulation model for the State Route 91 (SR-91) Corridor System Management Plan (CSMP) study in Orange County, CA. The calibrated model was used as the base model for testing alternative build scenarios under future conditions. The Orange County section of the SR-91 is 25 miles long from the Los Angeles County line to the Riverside County line and includes interchanges with 5 different freeways. SR-91 contains both HOV, Toll, and mixed use lane facilities. All freeway facilities as well as most major arterials and their signalized intersections are included in the model. This model focuses on both the morning and afternoon rush hours from 6:00 to 10:00 AM and 2:00 to 8:00 PM, respectively, in order to cover all periods of congested travel.

== Release history ==
- TransModeler 1.0 - December 2005
- TransModeler 2.0 - January 2009
- TransModeler 3.0 - December 2012
- TransModeler 4.0 - October 2014
- TransModeler 5.0 - March 2018
- TransModeler 6.0 - October 2020
- TransModeler 6.1 - January 2022

== See also ==
- Maptitude GIS mapping software
- Caliper Corporation
