= Caliper Corporation =

US-based mapping software developer

- Type: Private
- Industry: Mapping Software, Geographic Information Systems (GIS)
- Founded: Newton, Massachusetts (1983)
- Headquarters: Newton, Massachusetts, U.S. 42°19′49.67″N 71°12′42.23″W
- Key people: Howard Slavin, Founder/President
- Products: Maptitude, TransCAD, TransModeler
- Website: www.caliper.com

Caliper Corporation was founded in 1983 as a developer of mapping software and is headquartered in Newton, Massachusetts.

Caliper develops geographic information systems (GIS) and transportation software. Caliper is also a consulting and R&D provider offering professional services in quantitative management consulting, transportation, and decision support systems development.

Caliper is the developer of the TransCAD transportation planning software, TransModeler traffic simulation software, and Maptitude GIS packages.

== TransCAD ==
TransCAD is software for transportation planning. In addition to the standard point, line, area, and image layers in a GIS map, TransCAD supports route system layers and has tools for creating, manipulating and displaying routes. TransCAD uses a network data structure to support routing and network optimization models. TransCAD includes trip generation, distribution, mode choice, and traffic assignment models that support transportation planning and travel demand forecasting. TransCAD has a set of dynamic segmentation and linear referencing tools for managing highway, rail, pipeline, and other networks.

=== Product history ===
TransCAD was first released as a MS-DOS-based transportation GIS package in 1985. TransCAD 3.0, the first Microsoft Windows version, was released on May 28, 1996. TransCAD 4.8 was replaced by TransCAD 5.0 on January 2, 2008, and later TransCAD 6.0 and TransCAD 7.0. The most current version is TransCAD 8.0.

=== Web-based version ===
TransCAD for the Web is a web-based version of TransCAD that uses application source code that can be edited using Javascript, HTML, and ASP.NET. Application templates (Mapplications) are used to create a web application or service. The default templates include Ajax applications and mashups that use Google Maps via the Google Map API. TransCAD for the Web was the first web-based GIS for Transportation (GIS-T), and remains the only transportation GIS with web development capabilities.

== Maptitude for Redistricting ==
Maptitude for Redistricting is a related, but separate product, to Maptitude. By 2001, Caliper's new redistricting mapping technology was being used by over fifty percent of the United States's legislatures to draft new electoral district boundaries following the 1999 census. In 2011, California established a citizens redistricting commission that used Maptitude to successfully redraw the maps.
