= A. Alan Middleton =

American disordered materials physicist

- Citizenship: American
- Education: Princeton University; Cambridge University; Harvey Mudd College
- Known for: Disordered Materials; Biham–Middleton–Levine traffic model
- Awards: APS Fellow (2010); AAAS Fellow (2016)
- Scientific career
- Workplaces: Syracuse University
- Thesis: Critical and qualitative behavior of sliding charge density waves (1990)
- Doctoral advisor: Daniel S. Fisher
- Other academic advisors: M. Cristina Marchetti
- Website: aamiddle.expressions.syr.edu

Arthur Alan Middleton is a professor of physics and the associate dean of the College of Arts and Sciences at Syracuse University. He is known for his work in the fields of disordered materials such as random magnets, spin glasses, and interfaces in a random environment, transport in disordered materials, interface motion, and colloidal assemblies, condensed matter physics, statistical physics, and computational physics, connections between algorithm dynamics, computer science analyses, algorithms for efficient simulation of complex dynamics, including heuristic coarse graining for glassy materials.

== Education ==
Middleton earned his bachelor's in mathematics and physics with distinction at Harvey Mudd College in 1984. He received Churchill Scholarship and moved to Cambridge University where he earned a certificate of advanced study. He also received the NSF-GRFP grant from the National Science Foundation in 1984. Middleton joined Princeton University in 1986 and earned a PhD in physics in October 1990.

== Career ==
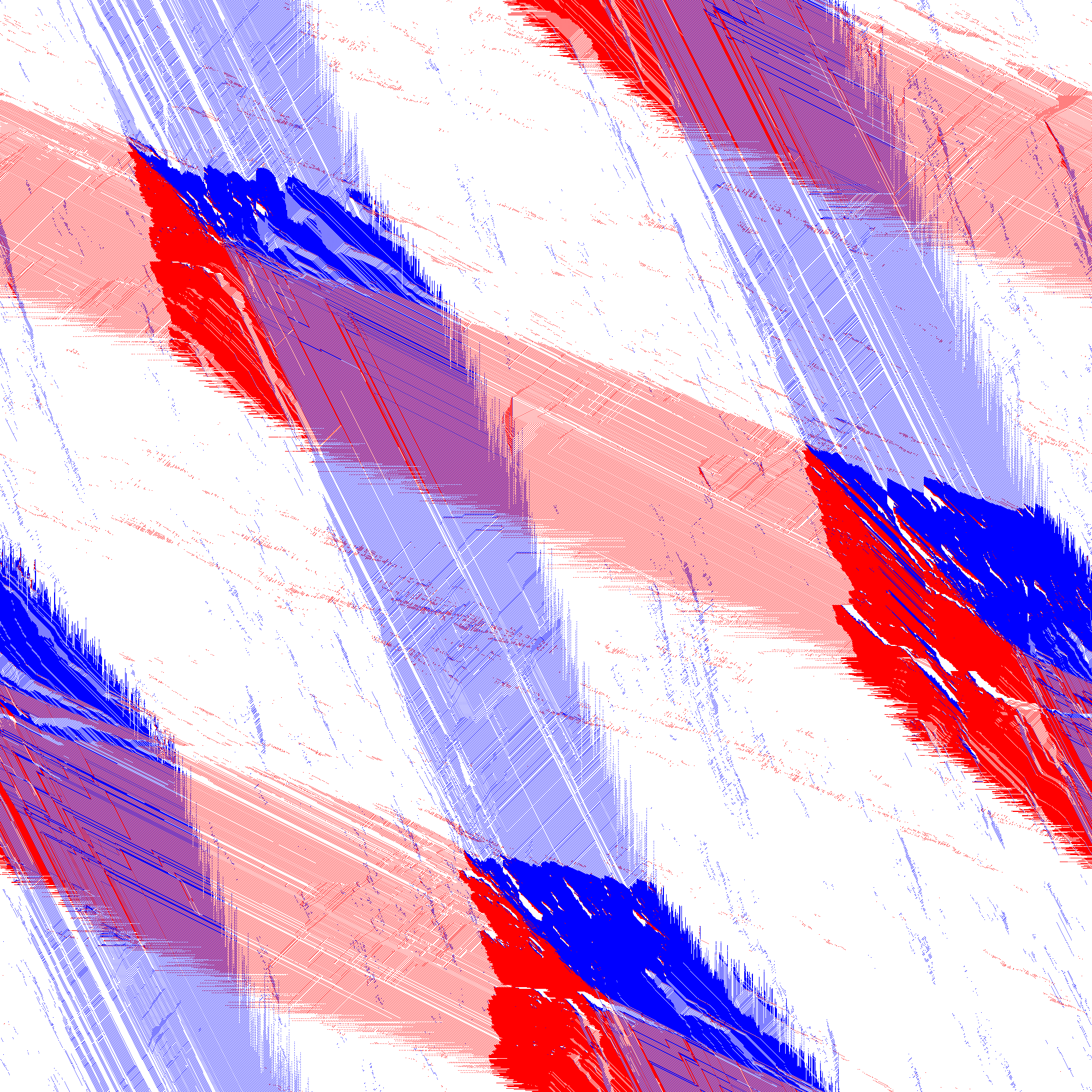
The Biham–Middleton–Levine traffic model, named after Ofer Biham, Middleton, and Dov Levine

From 1990 to 1992 Middleton was a research associate in the physics department at Syracuse University. From 1992 to 1994 he was a visiting scientist at the NEC Research Institute in Princeton, New Jersey.

He joined the Department of Physics at Syracuse in 1995 as an assistant professor and became a full professor in 2008. He was director of undergraduate studies in physics from 2000 to 2007 and associate chair of the department from 2009 to 2013. He chaired the department from 2013 to 2017.

Middleton was named associate dean for research and scholarship of the College of Arts and Sciences in 2017 and held the post until 2023. In this role he oversaw the hiring of the college's first two directors of proposal development, one for the sciences and mathematics and one for the humanities. The college received a record $23.4 million in research awards in 2022, and its research expenditures reached a record $19.7 million in 2023.

In November 2025 Middleton returned to the post as interim associate dean for creativity, scholarship and research, after Jennifer Ross was appointed interim dean of the university's College of Engineering and Computer Science. The interim appointment ran until 30 June 2026. On 1 July 2026 he was succeeded by the geologist Gregory Hoke and became interim chair of the Department of Mathematics.

== Research ==
In 1992 Middleton showed analytically that, in models of sliding charge density waves and related driven systems with randomness, a sliding configuration approaches a unique solution at long times. The same year he formulated the Biham–Middleton–Levine traffic model with Ofer Biham and Dov Levine.

In 1993, with Ned Wingreen, he studied collective charge transport in arrays of small metal dots separated by tunnel barriers. They showed that disorder produces a threshold voltage for conduction that grows linearly with the size of the array, and predicted analytically how the current grows above the threshold. With Chao Tang he explained the self-organized criticality of the Olami–Feder–Christensen model, which has no conservation law, as the result of synchronisation between its elements.

His later work applied exact optimisation algorithms to disordered magnets. With Daniel Fisher he studied the zero-temperature ordering transition of the three-dimensional random-field Ising magnet.

With his doctoral student Creighton K. Thomas he developed a fast matching algorithm for ground states of two-dimensional Ising spin glasses, based on the Kasteleyn treatment of the Ising model.

== Awards ==
Middleton was elected a fellow of the American Physical Society in 2010 for "his innovative numerical studies of the dynamical and static properties of disordered condensed matter systems, including charge density waves, spin glasses and disordered elastic media".

He received the Alfred P. Sloan Foundation Fellowship in 1995.

Middleton was elected Fellow of the American Association for the Advancement of Science in 2016.

== See also ==
- Biham–Middleton–Levine traffic model
