= Maptitude =

Mapping software

- Original author: Caliper Corporation
- Developer: Caliper Corporation
- Release: 1995; 31 years ago
- Stable release: 2025 / March 5, 2025
- Operating system: Microsoft Windows
- Available in: English, Spanish, Korean, Chinese
- Type: Mapping Software, GIS, GIS software
- License: Proprietary
- Website: Maptitude Mapping Software

Maptitude is a mapping software program, a mapping tool, and a Geographic Information System (GIS) created by Caliper Corporation that allows users to view, edit and integrate maps. The software is designed to allow the geographical visualization and analysis of either included data or custom external data. The primary use sales territory management.

== Software ==
Maptitude includes tools for geocoding addresses and records the geocode precision—the method used to locate each address—in the attribute table. Maptitude offers sales territory mapping features that allow users to manage territories based on geographic data. The software also provides routing and logistics. Routes can be optimized based on distance, travel time, or user-defined cost factors.

The Caliper technology is used in the following end-user desktop software:

- Maptitude (for international users, with primary markets in, and tailored add-ons for, the United States, United Kingdom, Canada, Australia, Europe, and Brazil; with additional versions for Argentina, Chile, Colombia, France, Germany, India, Ireland, Italy, Mexico, Netherlands, New Zealand, Spain, and South Africa)
- Maptitude for Redistricting (for redistricting professionals)
- Maptitude for Precinct and Election Management (for county and state election offices)
- Political Maptitude (for political campaign strategists) [Discontinued in 2008]
- TransCAD (for transportation professionals)
- TransModeler (for traffic simulation)

Caliper technology is also used in the following web-based software:

- Maptitude for the Web [Discontinued]
- TransCAD for the Web
- Maptitude Online [Released in 2022]

The discontinued Maptitude used application source code that was edited using JavaScript, HTML, and ASP.NET. Application templates (Mapplications) were used to create a web application or service. The default templates included Ajax applications and mashups that used Google Maps via the Google Maps API. The product was replaced with the Maptitude Online SaaS.

== Product history ==
Maptitude was first released as Maptitude 3.0 in 1995, and numbered to agree with TransCAD 3.0, the first Microsoft Windows version of that software. The Community 2020 edition was released in 1997, a product developed for the U.S. Dept. of Housing and Urban Development (HUD). Maptitude 4.0 was released later that same year (1997) and subsequent versions included 2000 U.S. census data and additional capabilities. The MAF/TIGER Partnership Software (MTPS) edition was released in 2008, a product developed for the U.S. Census Bureau.

New versions have sometimes been released before the equivalent TransCAD releases, and have been identically numbered, but recent versions have always followed the release date of the TransCAD software. Maptitude 2012 represented a shift in the version numbering, from a sequential release value to a year number.

The software is available for Microsoft Windows.

== See also ==
- TransModeler Traffic simulation mapping software
- Caliper Corporation
- Felt (GIS company)
