= Intelligent driver model =

Microscopic traffic flow model

The intelligent driver model (IDM) is a time-continuous car-following traffic flow model for the simulation of freeway and urban traffic. It was developed by Treiber, Hennecke, and Helbing in 2000 to improve upon the results of other "intelligent" driver models, such as Gipps' model.

== Model definition ==
As a car-following model, the IDM describes the dynamics of the positions and velocities of single vehicles.

The influencing factors of the IDM are the speed of the vehicle, the bumper-to-bumper gap to the leading vehicle, and the relative speed of the two vehicles. The model output is the acceleration chosen by the driver for that situation. The model parameters describe the driving style.

The IDM equation, for the dynamics of vehicle $\alpha$, reads as follows:

$$\dot{v}_\alpha = a \left( 1 - \left(\frac{v_\alpha}{v_0}\right)^\delta - \left(\frac{s^*(v_\alpha,\Delta v_\alpha)}{s_\alpha}\right)^2 \right)$$
$$\text{with }s^*(v_\alpha,\Delta v_\alpha) = s_0 + v_\alpha\,T + \frac{v_\alpha\,\Delta v_\alpha}{2\,\sqrt{a\,b}}$$

where:

- $v$ is the velocity of the vehicle;
- $s_{\alpha}$ is the bumper-to-bumper distance to the next vehicle;
- $\Delta v$ is velocity difference (approaching rate) to the next vehicle;
- $v_0$ is desired velocity of the vehicle — the speed it would drive at in free traffic;
- $s_0$ is the minimum gap to the next vehicle — kept when traffic is at a standstill;
- $T$ is the minimum possible time to the next vehicle;
- $a$ is the maximum vehicle acceleration;
- $b$ is the target deceleration rate (i.e. comfortable braking rate), a positive number.

The exponent $\delta$ is usually set to 4.

== Model characteristics ==
The acceleration of vehicle $\alpha$ can be separated into a free road term and an interaction term:

$\qquad\dot{v}^\text{free}_\alpha = a\,\left( 1 - \left(\frac{v_\alpha}{v_0}\right)^\delta \right)$

$\qquad\dot{v}^\text{int}_\alpha = -a\,\left(\frac{s^*(v_\alpha,\Delta v_\alpha)}{s_\alpha}\right)^2 = -a\,\left(\frac{s_0 + v_\alpha\,T}{s_\alpha} + \frac{v_\alpha\,\Delta v_\alpha}{2\,\sqrt{a\,b}\,s_\alpha}\right)^2$

- Free road behavior: On a free road, the distance to the leading vehicle $s_\alpha$ is large and the vehicle's acceleration is dominated by the free road term, which is approximately equal to $a$ for low velocities and vanishes as $v_\alpha$ approaches $v_0$. Therefore, a single vehicle on a free road will asymptotically approach its desired velocity $v_0$.
- Behavior at high approaching rates: For large velocity differences, the interaction term is governed by $-a\,(v_\alpha\,\Delta v_\alpha)^2\,/\,(2\,\sqrt{a\,b}\,s_\alpha)^2 = -(v_\alpha\,\Delta v_\alpha)^2\,/\,(4\,b\,s_\alpha^2)$. This leads to a driving behavior that compensates velocity differences while trying not to brake much harder than the comfortable braking deceleration $b$.
- Behavior at small net distances: For negligible velocity differences and small net distances, the interaction term is approximately equal to $-a\,(s_0 + v_\alpha\,T)^2\,/\,s_\alpha^2$, which resembles a simple repulsive force, such that small net distances are quickly enlarged towards an equilibrium net distance.

== Solution example ==
Let's assume a ring road with 50 vehicles. Then, vehicle 1 will follow vehicle 50. Initial speeds are given and since all vehicles are considered equal, vector ODEs are further simplified to:

$$\dot{x} = \frac{\mathrm{d}x}{\mathrm{d}t} = v$$
$$\dot{v} = \frac{\mathrm{d}v}{\mathrm{d}t} = a\,\left( 1 - \left(\frac{v}{v_0}\right)^\delta - \left(\frac{s^*(v,\Delta v)}{s}\right)^2 \right)$$
$$\text{with }s^*(v,\Delta v) = s_0 + v\,T + \frac{v\,\Delta v}{2\,\sqrt{a\,b}}$$

For this example, the following values are given for the equation's parameters, in line with the original calibrated model.

Variable	Description	Value
$v_0$	Desired velocity	30 m/s
$T$	Safe time headway	1.5 s
$a$	Maximum acceleration	0.73 m/s^{2}
$b$	Comfortable Deceleration	1.67 m/s^{2}
$\delta$	Acceleration exponent	4
$s_0$	Minimum distance	2 m
-	Vehicle length	5 m

The two ordinary differential equations are solved using Runge–Kutta methods of orders 1, 3, and 5 with the same time step, to show the effects of computational accuracy in the results.

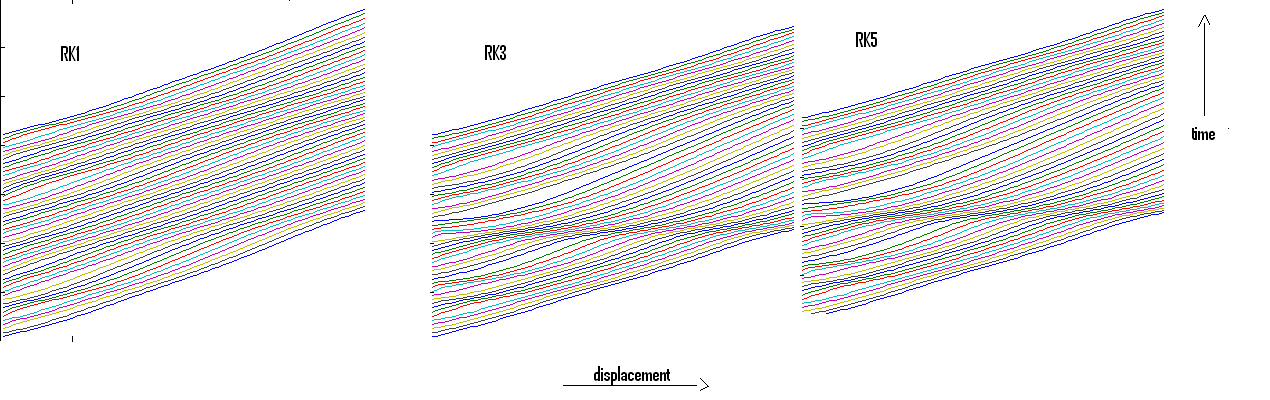
Comparison of differential equation solutions for intelligent driver model using RK1,3,5

This comparison shows that the IDM does not show extremely irrealistic properties such as negative velocities or vehicles sharing the same space even for from a low order method such as with the Euler's method (RK1). However, traffic wave propagation is not as accurately represented as in the higher order methods, RK3 and RK 5. These last two methods show no significant differences, which lead to conclude that a solution for IDM reaches acceptable results from RK3 upwards and no additional computational requirements would be needed. Nonetheless, when introducing heterogeneous vehicles and both jam distance parameters, this observation could not suffice.

== See also ==
- Gipps' model
- Newell's car-following model
- Microscopic traffic flow model
- List of Runge–Kutta methods
- Traffic simulation
