= Microscopic traffic flow model =

Microscopic traffic flow models are a class of scientific models of vehicular traffic dynamics.

In contrast, to macroscopic models, microscopic traffic flow models simulate single vehicle-driver units, so the dynamic variables of the models represent microscopic properties like the position and velocity of single vehicles.

== Car-following models ==
Also known as time-continuous models, all car-following models have in common that they are defined by ordinary differential equations describing the complete dynamics of the vehicles' positions $x_\alpha$ and velocities $v_\alpha$. It is assumed that the input stimuli of the drivers are restricted to their own velocity $v_\alpha$, the net distance (bumper-to-bumper distance) $s_\alpha = x_{\alpha-1} - x_\alpha - \ell_{\alpha-1}$ to the leading vehicle $\alpha-1$ (where $\ell_{\alpha-1}$ denotes the vehicle length), and the velocity $v_{\alpha-1}$ of the leading vehicle. The equation of motion of each vehicle is characterized by an acceleration function that depends on those input stimuli:

$$\ddot{x}_\alpha(t) = \dot{v}_\alpha(t) = F(v_\alpha(t), s_\alpha(t), v_{\alpha-1}(t), s_{\alpha-1}(t))$$

In general, the driving behavior of a single driver-vehicle unit $\alpha$ might not merely depend on the immediate leader $\alpha-1$ but on the $n_a$ vehicles in front. The equation of motion in this more generalized form reads:

$$\dot{v}_\alpha(t) = f(x_\alpha(t), v_\alpha(t), x_{\alpha-1}(t), v_{\alpha-1}(t), \ldots, x_{\alpha-n_a}(t), v_{\alpha-n_a}(t))$$

=== Examples of car-following models ===
- Optimal velocity model (OVM)
- Velocity difference model (VDIFF)
- Wiedemann model (1974)
- Gipps' model (Gipps, 1981)
- Intelligent driver model (IDM, 1999)
- DNN based anticipatory driving model (DDS, 2021)
- Rakha-Pasumarthy-Adjerid model (RPA model)
- Fadhloun-Rakha model (FR model)

== Cellular automaton models ==
Cellular automaton (CA) models use integer variables to describe the dynamical properties of the system. The road is divided into sections of a certain length $\Delta x$ and the time is discretized to steps of $\Delta t$. Each road section can either be occupied by a vehicle or empty and the dynamics are given by updated rules of the form:

$$v_\alpha^{t+1} = f(s_\alpha^t, v_\alpha^t, v_{\alpha-1}^t, \ldots)$$
$$x_\alpha^{t+1} = x_\alpha^t + v_\alpha^{t+1}\Delta t$$

(the simulation time $t$ is measured in units of $\Delta t$ and the vehicle positions $x_\alpha$ in units of $\Delta x$).

The time scale is typically given by the reaction time of a human driver, $\Delta t = 1 \text{s}$. With $\Delta t$ fixed, the length of the road sections determines the granularity of the model. At a complete standstill, the average road length occupied by one vehicle is approximately 7.5 meters. Setting $\Delta x$ to this value leads to a model where one vehicle always occupies exactly one section of the road and a velocity of 5 corresponds to $5 \Delta x/\Delta t = 135 \text{km/h}$, which is then set to be the maximum velocity a driver wants to drive at. However, in such a model, the smallest possible acceleration would be $\Delta x/(\Delta t)^2 = 7.5 \text{m}/\text{s}^2$ which is unrealistic. Therefore, many modern CA models use a finer spatial discretization, for example $\Delta x = 1.5 \text{m}$, leading to a smallest possible acceleration of $1.5 \text{m}/\text{s}^2$.

Although cellular automaton models lack the accuracy of the time-continuous car-following models, they still have the ability to reproduce a wide range of traffic phenomena. Due to the simplicity of the models, they are numerically very efficient and can be used to simulate large road networks in real-time or even faster.

=== Examples of cellular automaton models ===
- Rule 184
- Biham–Middleton–Levine traffic model
- Nagel–Schreckenberg model (NaSch, 1992)

== See also ==
- Microsimulation
