= Hesham Rakha =

Engineering academic

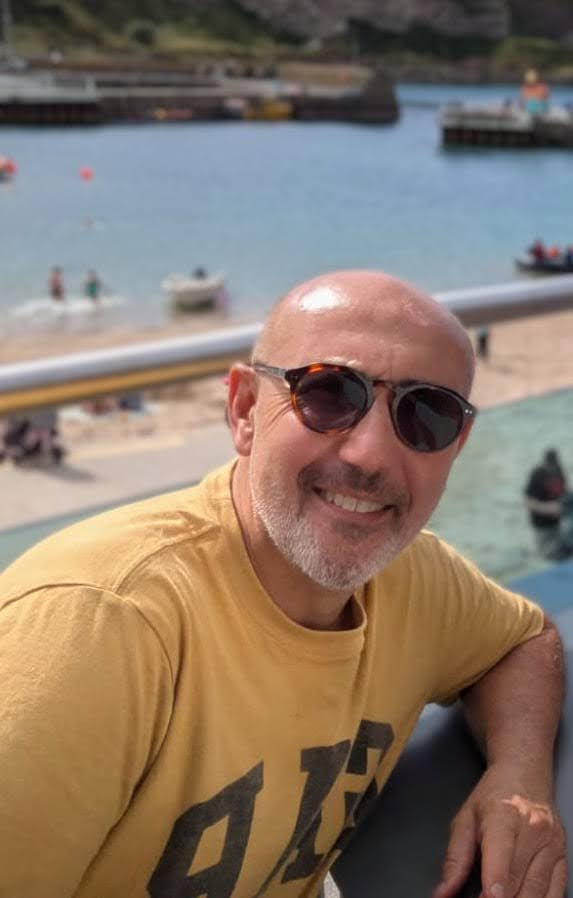
- Rakha in 2025
- Education: Cairo University; Queen's University
- Known for: Multi-modal vehicle motion and large-scale transportation system optimization, agent-based modeling, and assessment
- Scientific career
- Workplaces: Queen's University; Virginia Tech
- Thesis: A Simulation Approach for Modeling Real-Time Traffic Signal Controls (1993)
- Website: https://rakha.cee.vt.edu

Hesham Ahmed Rakha is the Samuel Reynolds Pritchard Professor of Engineering in the Charles E. Via, Jr. Department of Civil and Environmental Engineering at Virginia Tech. He directs the Center for Sustainable Mobility at the Virginia Tech Transportation Institute. He conducts research in the area of multi-modal vehicle motion and large-scale transportation system optimization, agent-based modeling, and assessment. He is a fellow of the Canadian Academy of Engineering and was elected to the Virginia Academy of Science, Engineering, and Medicine. In addition, he is a fellow of the American Society of Civil Engineers and the Institute of Electrical and Electronics Engineers (IEEE).

== Education and career ==
Rakha studied engineering at Cairo University and graduated with honors in 1987. He then moved to Canada in 1988 to complete his M.Sc. and PhD degrees at Queen's University in 1990 and 1993, respectively. His PhD thesis was entitled A Simulation Approach for Modeling Real-Time Traffic Signal Controls.

Rakha worked as an engineer for Science Applications International Corporation and a postdoctoral fellow at Queen's University from 1993 to 1996 and an Adjunct Assistant Professor at Queen's University from 1996 to 1997. In 1997, he joined the Virginia Tech Transportation Institute (formerly known as the Center for Transportation Research) as a Research Scientist. He then became an Assistant Professor in the Charles E. Via, Jr. Department of Civil and Environmental Engineering in 1999 and moved up the ranks and is currently the Samuel Reynolds Pritchard Professor of Engineering at Virginia Tech and directs the Center for Sustainable Mobility at the Virginia Tech Transportation Institute.

Rakha's areas of research include developing algorithms to model traffic flows and optimise traffic signals. He has also conducted research on the impact of automated vehicles, and the rollback of vehicle emission standards. His research has investigated the adoption of electric vehicles and their impact on transportation systems.

== Awards and honors ==
- 2025 Member, Virginia Academy of Science, Engineering, and Medicine (VASEM)
- 2024 Fellow, International Artificial Intelligence Industry Alliance
- 2023 Fellow, Canadian Academy of Engineering (FCAE)
- 2022 Fellow, American Society of Civil Engineers (F.ASCE)
- 2021 IEEE ITS Outstanding Research Award, IEEE Intelligent Transportation Systems Society
- 2020 Fellow, IEEE (FIEEE)
