= Ofer Biham =

Israeli physicist

- עופר ביהם
- Citizenship: Israel
- Education: Hebrew University of Jerusalem (Ph.D.)
- Occupation: Physicist

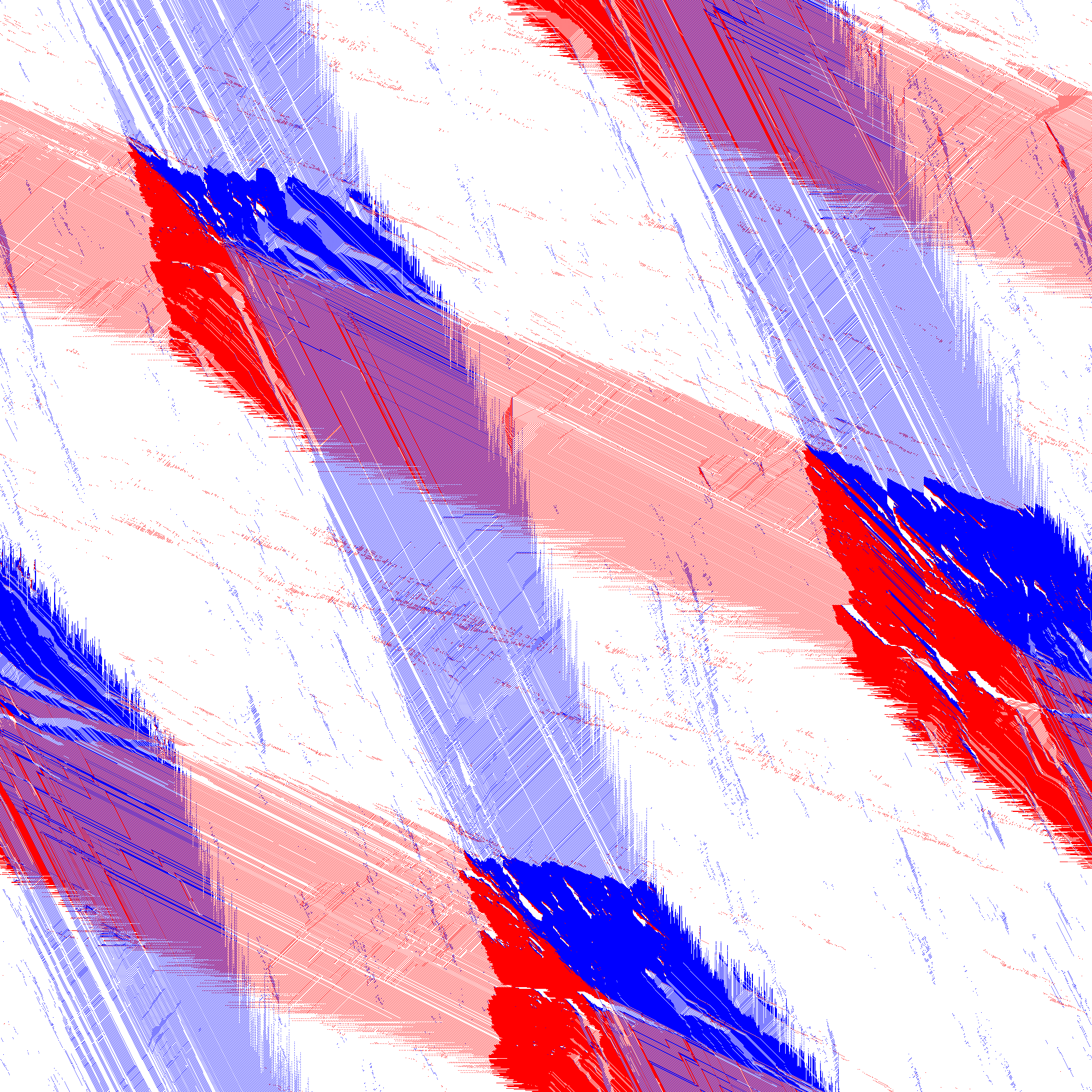
The Biham–Middleton–Levine traffic model, named after Ofer Biham, A. Alan Middleton, and Dov Levine.

Ofer Biham (Hebrew: עופר ביהם) is a faculty member at The Racah Institute of Physics of the Hebrew University of Jerusalem. Biham received his Ph.D. for research on quasiperiodic systems at the Weizmann Institute of Science in 1988, under the supervision of David Mukamel.

== Biography ==
In later years, Biham was involved in the development of methods for the calculation of unstable periodic orbits in chaotic systems, models for efficient simulations of traffic flow and quantum computation.

The focus of Biham's current research is on the development of computational methodologies for the simulation of stochastic processes in interstellar chemistry and in genetic networks. Biham is known for the Biham–Middleton–Levine traffic model which he formulated with A. Alan Middleton and Dov Levine in 1992. It is possibly the simplest model containing phase transitions and self-organization.

His doctoral students include Daniel Lidar.

== Bibliography ==
- Perets, Hagai B.; Biham, Ofer; Manico, Giulio; Pirronello, Valerio; Roser, Joe; Swords, Sol; Vidali, Gianfranco (2005-07-10). "Molecular Hydrogen Formation on Ice Under Interstellar Conditions". The Astrophysical Journal. 627 (2). IOP Publishing: 850–860. arXiv:astro-ph/0412202. doi:10.1086/430435. ISSN 0004-637X.
- Biham, Ofer; Middleton, A. Alan; Levine, Dov (1992-11-01). "Self-organization and a dynamical transition in traffic-flow models". Physical Review A. 46 (10). American Physical Society (APS): R6124–R6127. arXiv:cond-mat/9206001. doi:10.1103/physreva.46.r6124. ISSN 1050-2947.
- Biham, Ofer; Wenzel, Wolfgang (1989-08-21). "Characterization of unstable periodic orbits in chaotic attractors and repellers". Physical Review Letters. 63 (8). American Physical Society (APS): 819–822. doi:10.1103/physrevlett.63.819. ISSN 0031-9007.
- Lipshtat, Azi; Loinger, Adiel; Balaban, Nathalie Q.; Biham, Ofer (2006-05-08). "Genetic Toggle Switch without Cooperative Binding". Physical Review Letters. 96 (18) 188101. American Physical Society (APS). arXiv:q-bio/0603026. doi:10.1103/physrevlett.96.188101. ISSN 0031-9007.
